There have been several families from around the world of which two or more members have been involved in rugby league football at the highest levels since the sport's inception in 1895. Below is an incomplete list of families that have been involved in rugby league.

A

Abbott family 
Edwin Abbott, New Zealand international, uncle of Bill Deacon
Bill Deacon, New Zealand international, nephew of Edwin Abbot

Ackland family 
Ron Ackland, New Zealand international and Auckland representative player and coach; uncle of John
John Ackland, New Zealand international and Auckland representative player; Nephew of Ron

Adamson family of England 
Luke Adamson, Salford City Reds, Super League, Halifax, Championship, London Broncos, England U18's (brother of Tobias Adamson)
Tobias Adamson, North Wales Crusaders, Championship, Dewsbury Rams, Championship (brother of Luke Adamson) Joshua Adamson, Leigh East, & Liverpool University

Adamson family of Australia 
 Matt Adamson (born 1972), Australian SL international; NSW and NSW SL representative; Parramatta Eels/Penrith Panthers/Leeds Rhinos/Canberra Raiders player; rugby league assistant coach; younger brother of Phil.
 Phil Adamson (born 1970), NSW SL representative; Parramatta Eels/Penrith Panthers/Manly Sea Eagles/St Helens player; elder brother of Matt.

Agar family 
Allan Agar, Featherstone and Dewsbury RFL player and coach; father of Richard
Richard Agar, Featherstone and Dewsbury RFL player and Super League coach; son of Allan

Ah Mau brothers 
Isaak Ah Mau (born 1982), New Zealand Warriors and North Queensland Cowboys NRL player
Leeson Ah Mau (born 1989), New Zealand Warriors, North Queensland Cowboys and St George Illawarra Dragons NRL player

Albert brothers 
Stanton Albert (born 1995), PNG international, PNG Hunters, Widnes Vikings, N Wales Crusaders; brother of Wellington
Wellington Albert (born 1994), PNG international, PNG Hunters, Widnes Vikings, N Wales Crusaders, Leeds Rhinos, Featherstone Rovers & Keighley Cougars; brother of Stanton

Alexander brothers & extended family 
Greg Alexander (born 1965), Australian international, New South Wales representative, Penrith Panthers and Auckland Warriors player
Ben Alexander (1970–1992), Penrith Panthers NSWRL player
Mark Geyer (born 1967), Australian international, New South Wales representative, brother-in-law of Greg and Ben
Cameron King (born 1991), brother-in-law of Greg
Peter Shiels (born 1973), brother-in-law of Greg and Ben

Anderson brothers 
Vinnie Anderson (born 1979), New Zealand international, NRL and Super League player
Fraser Anderson (born 1984), Tonga international and NRL player
Louis Anderson (born 1985), New Zealand international, NRL and Super League player

Anderson family 
Ben Anderson, Melbourne Storm player; Canterbury-Bankstown Bulldogs NYC coach; son of Chris Anderson, brother of Jarrad and nephew of Steve Folkes
Chris Anderson, Australian international; NSW representative; Canterbury-Bankstown Bulldogs/Widnes/Hull Kingston Rovers/Halifax player; two-time premiership-winning coach; father of Ben and Jarrad, and brother-in-law to Steve Folkes
Jarrad Anderson, Cronulla-Sutherland Sharks player; son of Chris Anderson, brother of Ben and nephew of Steve Folkes

Asher brothers 
Albert Asher, New Zealand international
Ernie Asher, New Zealand international

Arkwright brothers 
John Arkwright, Great Britain international and St. Helens player; father of John and grandfather of Chris
John Arkwright, Jr., St Helens player; son of John, Sr. and father of Chris
Chris Arkwright, Great Britain international and St Helens player; grandson of John and son of John, Jr.

Aubusson brothers 
James Aubusson (born 1986), Sydney Roosters NRL player
Mitchell Aubusson (born 1987), Sydney Roosters NRL player

B

Backo family 
Sam Backo (born 1961), Australian international, Queensland representative and Canberra Raiders / Brisbane Broncos player; father of Daniel
Daniel Backo (born 1986), North Queensland Cowboys NRL player; son of Sam

Bailey brothers of Australia 
Phil Bailey (born 1981), Australian international, New South Wales representative and Manly-Warringah/Northern Eagles/Cronulla NRL player
Chris Bailey (born 1982), Newcastle Knights and Manly-Warringah NRL player

Bailey family of New Zealand 
Gary Bailey, New Zealand international and brother of Roger and Bob
Roger Bailey, New Zealand international and brother of Gary and Bob
Bob Bailey, New Zealand international coach and brother of Roger and Gary
David Bailey, New Zealand Māori representative and son of Roger

Baitieri family 
Tas Baitieri, Penrith and Canterbury-Bankstown NSWRL player, France international coach; father of Jason
Jason Baitieri (born 1989), France international and Sydney Roosters NRL player; son of Tas

Barclay brothers 
Frank Barclay/Hauauru Pakere; New Zealand international and New Zealand Māori representative
Glen Barclay/Punga Pakere; North Sydney Bears and New Zealand Māori representative

Barnes family 
Keith Barnes (b. 1934 in Wales), Australian international player; cousin of Gwyl
Gwyl Barnes, Eastern Suburbs NSWRFL player; cousin of Keith

Barba brothers 
Ben Barba, Canterbury Bulldogs, Brisbane Broncos, Cronulla Sharks & Indigenous Allstars Rep; older brother of Marmin
Marmin Barba, Parramatta Eels, Gold Coast Titans and Brisbane Broncos; younger brother of Ben

Batchelor brothers 
James Batchelor (born 1998); Wakefield Trinity, brother of Joe
Joe Batchelor (born 1994); Coventry Bears, York City Knights & St Helens, brother of James

Batten family 
Billy Batten, English international and Hunslet RFL player; father of Billy, Jr., Eric and Bob and grandfather of Ray
Billy Batten, Jr., RFL player; son of Billy, brother of Eric and Bob, and father of Ray
Eric Batten, English international and Hunslet RFL player; son of Billy, brother of Billy, Jr. and Bob, and uncle of Ray
Bob Batten, RFL player; son of Billy, brother of Billy, Jr. and Eric, and uncle of Ray
Ray Batten, English international and Leeds RFL player; grandson of Billy, son of Billy, Jr. and nephew of Eric and Bob

Beardmore brothers 
Bob Beardmore, Castleford RFL player
Kevin Beardmore, Great Britain international representative and Castleford RFL player

Beckett brothers 
Lenny Beckett (born 1980), Newcastle Knights & Northern Eagles; brother of Robbie
Robbie Beckett (born 1972), Penrith Panthers, Halifax RLFC & Wests Tigers; brother of Lenny

Bella brothers 
Anthony Bella, South Queensland Crushers
Martin Bella, Australian international, Queensland representative and North Sydney/Manly-Warringah/Canterbury/North Queensland/Gold Coast player
Robert Bella, Australian international

Belsham brothers 
Sel Belsham, New Zealand international
Vic Belsham, New Zealand international

Bell/Friend family 
George Bell, New Zealand Māori representative; brother of Ian, Cameron and Cathy
Ian Bell, New Zealand and Auckland representative; brother of George, Cameron and Cathy and uncle of Dean, Clayton and Glenn
Cameron Bell, New Zealand Māori international coach; brother of George, Ian and Cathy and father of Dean
Cathy Friend, Auckland and Māori Rugby League administrator; sister of George, Ian and Cameron, mother of Clayton and Aunt of Dean
Dean Bell (born 1962), New Zealand international player and Leeds Rhinos coach; son of Cameron, nephew of George, Ian and Cathy, cousin of Clayton and Glenn
Clayton Friend, New Zealand international; cousin of Dean.
Glenn Bell, rugby league footballer of the 1980s and 1990s

Benausse family 
Gilbert Benausse, French international
Patrice Benausse, son of Gilbert, French international
Rene Benausse, brother of Gilbert, French international

Bennett brothers 
Bob Bennett, Australian player and coach
Wayne Bennett, Australian player, Queensland representative and supercoach

Bentley brothers 
Andrew Bentley (born 1985), France international and Catalans Dragons player
Kane Bentley (born 1987), France international and Catalans Dragons player

Berrigan brothers 
Barry Berrigan (born 1975), Brisbane Broncos player
Shaun Berrigan (born 1978), Australian international and Queensland interstate representative, and Brisbane Broncos player

Bevan family 
Rick Bevan, Eastern Suburbs NSWRFL player and father of Brian
Brian Bevan (1924–1991), Eastern Suburbs NSWRFL player and son of Rick

Blake brothers 
Michael Blake (born 1961), Manly Warringah, Canberra and South Sydney NSWRL player
Phil Blake (born 1963), New South Wales Origin representative, Manly Warringah/South Sydney/North Sydney/Canberra/St George/Auckland NSWRL player, Warrington/Wigan RFL player

Blan brothers 
Albert Blan, England international, Swinton, Centre, Loose forward, later Coach.
Billy Blan, Great Britain & England international, Wigan, Leeds & St. Helens, Second-row/Loose forward.
 Jackie Blan, Wigan & Salford Loose forward.

Bolewski brothers 
Mick Bolewski (1888–1974), Australian international, Queensland interstate and Bundaberg player
Henry Bolewski, Australian international, Queensland interstate, and Glebe and Newtown NSWRFL player; Wales international coach
Alex Bolewski, Glebe and Newtown NSWRFL player
Walter Bolewski, Queensland representative and Bundaberg player

Bowen family 
Matt Bowen (born 1982), Australian international, Queensland Origin representative and North Queensland Cowboys NRL player; cousin of Brenton
Brenton Bowen (born 1983), North Queensland Cowboys and Gold Coast Titans NRL player; cousin of Matt
Javid Bowen (born 1993), North Queensland Cowboys NRL player; nephew of Matt and Brenton

Boyle family 
David Boyle (born 1971), Canberra Raiders & Bradford Bulls, father of Morgan & Millie
Millie Boyle (born 1998), Australia, NSW, Brisbane Broncos, daughter of David
Morgan Boyle (born 1996), Gold Coast Titans & Manly Sea Eagles; son of David

Bradstreet family 
Bill Bradstreet (born 1945), Australia international & Manly; father of Darren & son of Fred
Darren Bradstreet (born 1974), Illawarra Steelers & London Broncos; son of Bill
Fred Bradstreet, North Sydney Bears; father of Bill

Branighan family 
Ray Branighan (born 1947), Australian international, New South Wales representative and South Sydney/Manly-Warringah player; brother of Arthur and uncle of Luke
Arthur Branighan (born 1943), South Sydney Rabbitohs NSWRFL player; brother of Ray, father of Luke
Luke Branighan (born 1981), St George Illawarra and Cronulla Sharks NRL player; son of Arthur, nephew of Ray

Bridge brothers 
Chris Bridge (born 1984), England & Ireland international, Bradford Bulls, Warrington Wolves, Swinton Lions & Widnes; brother of Danny
Danny Bridge (born 1993), Ireland international, Warrington Wolves, Rochdale Hornets & Oldham RLFC; brother of Chris

Brimble brothers 
Cyril Brimble, Canterbury and Wellington representative
Ted Brimble, New Zealand international
Walter Brimble, New Zealand international
Wilfred Brimble, New Zealand international

Britt family 
Dean Britt (born 1994), Melbourne, South Sydney & Canterbury, son of Darren
Darren Britt (born 1969), Australia & NSW Country, Western Suburbs, Canterbury & St Helens; father of Dean

Bromwich brothers 
Jesse Bromwich (born 1989), New Zealand international and Melbourne Storm NRL player
Kenny Bromwich (born 1991), New Zealand international and Melbourne Storm NRL player

Brown brothers 
Len Brown, New Zealand international
Ray Brown, New Zealand international

Buchanan brothers 
Austin Buchanan (born 1984), London Broncos, Wakefield Trinity, Dewsbury & York City Knights; half-brother of Jamie
Jamie Jones-Buchanan (born 1981), GB & England, Leeds Rhinos; half-brother of Austin

Buckler brothers 
Arthur Buckler (1882–1921), Wales & Salford; brother of Herbert
Herbert Buckler (1878–1957), Salford & Other Nationalities ; brother of Arthur

Bugden brothers 
Geoff Bugden (born 1960), New South Wales representative, Parramatta and Newtown NSWRL player
Mark Bugden (born 1961), Newtown, Canterbury-Bankstown and Parramatta NSWRL player
Ian Bugden (born 1945), Sydney Roosters, St George Dragons

Burge brothers 
Albert Burge (1889–1943), South Sydney and Glebe NSWRFL player, Australian rugby international
Laidley Burge (1897–1990), Glebe NSWRFL player
Frank Burge (1894–1958), Australian international and New South Wales representative, Glebe/St George NSWRFL player, St George/Eastern Suburbs/North Sydney/Canterbury-Bankstown/Newtown/North Sydney/Western Suburbs NSWRFL coach
Peter Burge (1884–1956), Dual Australian rugby international, St George/Glebe NSWRFL player, St George NSWRFL coach

Burgess family I 
The Burgess' total of 30 Tests is a Great British record for a father and son combination.
William Burgess Sr. (1897–19??), England international, Barrow RFL player; father of William Jr
William Burgess Jr. (born 1939), Great Britain and England international, Barrow and Salford RFL player; son of William Sr

Burgess family II 
Mark Burgess, RFL player; father of Luke, Sam, Tom and George.
Luke Burgess (born 1987), Leeds/Doncaster/Harlequins/Salford/Catalans SL player, South Sydney/Manly-Warringah NRL player; son of Mark and brother of Sam, Tom and George.
Sam Burgess (born 1988), English international, Bradford SL and South Sydney NRL player; son of Mark and brother of Luke, Tom and George
Tom Burgess (born 1992), English international, Bradford SL and South Sydney NRL player; son of Mark and brother of Sam, Luke and George
George Burgess (born 1992), English international and South Sydney NRL player; son of Mark and brother of Sam, Luke and Tom

Burke family 
Peter Burke (born 1933), Australian international and New South Wales representative, Manly-Warringah NSWRL player; father of Matt and Brad
Brad Burke (born 1963), Eastern Suburbs NSWRL player; son of Peter, brother of Matt
Matt Burke (born 1964), Manly-Warringah and Eastern Suburbs NSWRL player; son of Peter, brother of Brad

C

Caine brothers 
Jess Caine (born 1984), South Sydney Rabbitohs NRL player
Joel Caine (born 1978), St. George Dragons/Balmain Tigers/Wests Tigers NRL player
Tony Caine (born 1986), Cronulla Sharks and St. George Illawarra Dragons NRL player

Calder/Pongia family 
Jim Calder, New Zealand international, grandfather of Quentin Pongia
Quentin Pongia, New Zealand international, grandson of Jim Calder

Campbell/Menzies family 
Mackie Campbell, Manly-Warringah NSWRFL player; grandfather of Steven Menzies
Steven Menzies, Australian international, New South Wales representative, Manly-Warringah/Northern Eagles NRL and Bradford Bulls/Catalans Dragons SL player; grandson of Mackie Campbell

Carlaw brothers 
Arthur Carlaw, New Zealand international
James Carlaw, New Zealand administrator

Carmichael family 
Alf Carmichael, England international & Hull KR; father of George
George Carmichael, Hull KR, Bradford Northern & Hull FC; son of Alf

Cartwright family 
Bryce Cartwright (born 1994), Penrith Panthers player; nephew of John
Jed Cartwright (born 1997), Penrith Panthers player; son of John
John Cartwright (born 1965), Penrith Panthers player and Gold Coast Titans coach; father of Jed and uncle of Bryce

Casey family 
Callum Casey (born 1990), Ireland international, Leeds Rhinos, Halifax, Hunslet & Batley; son of Leo
Connor Casey (born 1996), Leeds Rhinos; son of Leo
Leo Casey (born 1965), Ireland international, Oldham RLFC, Featherstone Rovers & Swinton Lions; father of Callum, Connor, Patrick & Sean
Patrick Casey (born 1998), Oldham St Anne's ARLFC; son of Leo
Sean Casey (born 1993), Leeds Rhinos; son of Leo

Cayless brothers 
Nathan Cayless (born 1978), New Zealand international and Parramatta Eels player
Jason Cayless (born 1980), New Zealand international and Parramatta, Sydney Roosters, St Helens RLFC & Wests Tigers player

Chapelhow brothers 
Jay Chapelhow (born 1995), Widnes Vikings & Newcastle Thunder, twin brother of Ted
Ted Chapelhow (born 1995), Widnes Vikings & Newcastle Thunder, twin brother of Jay

Chester family 
Charles Chester (1919–2011), Wakefield Trinity; father of David
David Chester (born 1946), Warrington, Wakefield, Keighley & Huddersfield; son of Charles

Chisnall brothers 
Dave Chisnall (1948–2013), Great Britain and England international, St Helens and Warrington RFL player
Eric Chisnall (born 1946), Great Britain and England international, St Helens and Leigh RFL player

Clawson family 
Terry Clawson (1940–2013), Great Britain international, Featherstone, Bradford, Hull KR, Leeds, Oldham and Wakefield Trinity RFL player; father of Martin
Martin Clawson, Bradford player; son of Martin

Cleal family 
Les Cleal, Eastern Suburbs NSWRL player; brother of Noel; uncle of Kane
Noel Cleal (born 1958), Australian international, New South Wales representative, Eastern Suburbs/Manly-Warringah NSWRL and Widnes/Hull RFL player, Hull RFL coach; brother of Les; father of Kane
Kane Cleal (born 1984), Manly-Warringah/South Sydney/Canterbury-Bankstown NRL player; son of Noel

Cleary family 
Ivan Cleary (born 1971), Manly-Warringah/North Sydney/Sydney City/New Zealand Warriors NRL player, New Zealand Warriors/Penrith and Wests Tigers coach; father of Nathan
Nathan Cleary (born 1997), Penrith NRL player; son of Ivan

Connell family 
Cyril Connell, Sr. (1899–1974) Queensland representative and QRL club player; father of Cyril, Jr.
Cyril Connell, Jr. (born 1928) Australian international, Queensland representative and QRL club player; son of Cyril, Sr.

Cooper brothers 
Lionel Cooper (1922–1987), Australian international, New South Wales representative and Eastern Suburbs NSWRFL and Huddersfield RFL player
Cec Cooper (born 1926), Queensland representative and Canterbury-Bankstown NSWRFL player and coach
Reg Cooper, Canterbury-Bankstown NSWRFL player
Col Cooper, Canterbury-Bankstown NSWRFL player
Noel Cooper, St. George NSWRFL player

Coote family 
Jack Coote (1907–1986), Eastern Suburbs NSWRFL player; father of Ron
Ron Coote (born 1944), Australian international and New South Wales representative and South Sydney and Eastern Suburbs NSWRFL player; son of Jack

Corbett brothers 
Claude Corbett (1885–1944), rugby league journalist;
Harold Corbett (1890–1917), Eastern Suburbs and Annandale NSWRFL player

Cordner brothers 
Dane Cordner, Newcastle Knights player; older brother of Boyd
Boyd Cordner (born 1992), Australian international and New South Wales representative player, Sydney Roosters NRL player; younger brother of Dane

Corvo brothers 
Alex Corvo, Canberra Raiders; brother of Mark
Mark Corvo (born 1973), Canberra Raiders, Adelaide Rams, Brisbane broncos & Salford; brother of Alex

Coyle brothers 
James Coyle (born 1985), Wigan Warriors player
Thomas Coyle (born 1988), Wigan Warriors player

Coyne brothers 
Peter Coyne (born 1964), St George Dragons NSWRL player
Mark Coyne (born 1967), Australian international, Queensland representative and St George and St George Illawarra NRL player

Cross family 
Paul Cross, Eastern Suburbs Roosters NSWRFL player and father of Ryan
Ryan Cross (born 1979), Sydney Roosters NRL player and son of Paul

Cross brothers 
Ben Cross (born 1978), New South Wales State of Origin and Newcastle Knights NRL player
Matt Cross (born 1981), Manly Sea Eagles NRL player

Cubitt brothers 
Les Cubitt (1893–1968), Australian international and New South Wales representative and Glebe NSWRFL player
Charlie Cubitt (1891–1968), Glebe NSWRFL player

Cunningham brothers 
Tommy Cunningham (born 1956), Wales international and St Helens player
Eddie Cunningham, Great Britain and Wales international, and St Helens player
Keiron Cunningham (born 1976), Great Britain and Wales international, and St Helens player

D

Daley family 
Doug Daley (1934–1994), Manly-Warringah NSWRFL player and administrator; father of Phil
Phil Daley (born 1964), Australian international, New South Wales Origin representative and Manly-Warringah/Gold Coast Seagulls NSWRL player; son of Doug

Dalton brothers 
William Francis Dalton (1888–1956), Eastern Suburbs player (number 58); brother of Bernard.
Bernard Hugh Dalton (1892–1929), Eastern Suburbs player (number 43).

Davidson brothers 
Bill Davidson, New Zealand international
Ben Davidson (1902–1961), New Zealand international and Wigan RFL player
George Davidson (1898–1948), Auckland representative

Davies brothers 
Connor Davies (born 1997), Wales international & Halifax; twin brother of Curtis
Curtis Davies (born 1997), Wales international, Halifax & Newcastle Thunder; twin brother of Connor

Davis family 
The Davis family falls into the broader Dunghutti peoples family tree.
 Paul Davis (born 1971), Balmain player, father of Paul and Nakia
 Paul Davis-Welsh (1994–2009), Gold Coast under-16s player
 Nakia Davis-Welsh (born 1996), Australian women's international
 (Adam Davis) (born 2007, Rabbitohs, NSW, Australian future full-back

De Belin family 
Fred de Belin, Australian international and New South Wales interstate representative and Balmain NSWRFL player; grandfather of Jack
Jack de Belin, St George Illawarra Dragons' 2011 Toyota Cup player of the year; grandson of Fred

Dimond family 
Bobby Dimond, Australian international, New South Wales representative and Western Suburbs NSWRFL player; older brother of Peter and uncle of Craig
Peter Dimond (1938–2021), Australian international, New South Wales representative and Western Suburbs NSWRFL player; younger brother of Bobby and father of Craig
Craig Dimond (born 1964), Illawarra Steelers/Cronulla Sutherland Sharks/Canberra Raiders NSWRL player; son of Peter

Dorahy family 
John Dorahy (born 1954), Australian international, New South Wales representative and Western Suburbs/Manly-Warringah/Illawarra Steelers/North Sydney Bears NSWRL and Hull KR/Halifax RFL player and Super League coach; father of Dane
Dane Dorahy (born 1977), Western Suburbs NRL player and Wakefield Trinity and Halifax SL player; son of John

Doyle brothers 
Joe Doyle, Brothers (Toowoomba), Australia international and Queensland interstate representative player; brother of Ian
Ian Doyle, All Whites (Toowoomba), Australia international and Queensland interstate representative player; brother of Joe

Drake twins 
Jim Drake (born 1931), English international and Hull F.C. player
Bill Drake (born 1931), English international and Hull F.C. player

Duane family 
 Ian Duane, Warrington Wolves
 Ronnie Duane, Warrington Wolves
 Robert Duane, Warrington RUFC

Dunemann brothers 
Ian Dunemann, North Queensland Cowboys NRL player
Andrew Dunemann (born 1976), Gold Coast Seagulls/North Queensland/South Sydney/Canberra NRL player and Halifax/Leeds/Salford SL player. Canberra coach (2013)

Dunghutti relatives 
The Dunghutti are an Indigenous Australian people native to the North-East of New South Wales, including the townships of Kempsey and Macksville. Many players with connections to the tribe are distantly related and refer to each other as cousins. This family tree includes:
 The Davis family
 The Roberts family
 Greg Inglis
 Albert Kelly, first cousin once removed of Preston Campbell, great nephew of Joseph Donovan
 Preston Campbell, first cousin once removed of Albert Kelly
 Brian Kelly
 Adrian Davis
 Beau Champion
 Matt Donovan

Dwyer family 
Connor Dwyer, Widnes Vikings; son of Bernard
Bernard Dwyer (born 1967), St Helens, Manly Sea Eagles, Bradford Bull; father of Connor

E

Eden family 
Harry Eden (1943–2006), Eastern Suburbs/St George/South Sydney NSWRFL player; uncle of Mike
Mike Eden (born 1960), Manly-Warringah/Eastern Suburbs/Parramatta/Gold Coast Giants NSWRL player; nephew of Harry

Edwards family 
Jackie Edwards, Warrington RFL player; father of Shaun, brother of Bobbby
Shaun Edwards, Great Britain and England, Ireland international, Wigan/London/Bradford RFL/SL and Balmain NSWRL player; son of Jackie, nephew of Bobby
Bobby Edwards, Warrington RFL player; brother of Jackie, uncle of Shaun

Edwards/Tamou family 
Kenny Edwards, Parramatta Eels player; cousin of James
James Tamou, Australian international, New South Wales Origin representative and North Queensland/Penrith NRL player; cousin of Kenny

Elias/Moses family 
 Benny Elias, Australian international, New South Wales representative, Balmain Tigers player; uncle of Mitchell.
 Mitchell Moses, Wests Tigers player; nephew of Benny.

Ellis family 
Allan Ellis, Newtown NSWRFL player; brother of Keith and Tom; father of Greg
Keith Ellis, Newtown NSWRFL player; brother of Allan and Tom; uncle of Greg
Tom Ellis, Newtown NSWRFL player; brother of Allan and Keith; uncle of Greg
Greg Ellis, Newtown NSWRFL player; son of Allan and nephew of Keith and Tom

El Masri family 
Hazem El Masri (born 1976), Lebanon and Australian international, New South Wales representative and Canterbury Bulldogs NRL player; brother of Samer
Samer El Masri, Lebanon international; brother of Hazem

Endacott family 
Frank Endacott, New Zealand international coach; father of Shane
Shane Endacott (born 1971), Hull RFL and Auckland Warriors SL/NRL player; son of Frank

Evans brothers 
Ben Evans, Welsh international
Rhys Evans, Welsh international

Evans brothers (inter-war period) 
Bryn Evans (1899–1975), Swinton and Great Britain international
Jack Evans (1871–1924), Swinton; father of Bryn & John
Jack Evans (1897–1940), Swinton and Great Britain international

Evans/Cherry-Evans family 
Troy Evans, Norths Devils and Redcliffe Dolphins BRL (Brisbane) player; father of Daly Cherry-Evans
Daly Cherry-Evans (born 1989), Australian international, Queensland Origin representative and Manly-Warringah NRL player; son of Troy Evans

F

Fages family 
Pascal Fages, France international & Pia player, father of Theo
Théo Fages, France international captain, son of Pascal

Faifai Loa/Smith family 
Kalifa Faifai Loa, NRL player, cousin of Jeremy Smith.
Jeremy Smith, New Zealand international, cousin of Kalifa.

Fairbank family 
Jack Fairbank, Leeds player, father of Karl, John, Dick and Mark
Karl Fairbank, Great Britain international and Bradford player; son of Jack; brother of John, Dick and Mark; uncle of Jacob
John Fairbank, Leeds, Oldham and Swinton player; son of Jack; brother of Karl, Dick and Mark; uncle of Jacob
Dick Fairbank, Halifax player; son of Jack; brother of Karl, John and Mark; uncle of Jacob
Mark Fairbank, Oldham and Keighley player; son of Jack; brother of Karl, John and Dick; father of Jacob
Jacob Fairbank, Huddersfield player; son of Mark

Farnsworth brothers 
Bill Farnsworth, Australian international and Newtown NSWRFL player
Viv Farnsworth (1891–1953), Australian international and Newtown NSWRFL player

Farrell/O'Loughlin family 
Andy Farrell (born 1975), Great Britain international and dual England rugby international, and Wigan SL player; uncle of Liam
Liam Farrell (born 1990), England international representative and Wigan player; nephew of Andy
Keiron O'Loughlin, Wigan, Workington, Widnes, Salford; father of Sean
Sean O'Loughlin (born 1982), GB & England, Wigan Warriors; brother-in-law of Andy Farrell

Farrell/Elsegood family 
Frank Farrell (1916–1985), Australian international, New South Wales representative and Newtown NSWRFL player and coach; grandfather of Jack Elsegood
Jack Elsegood (born 1973), Manly-Warringah and Sydney Roosters player; grandson of Frank Farrell

Feagai brothers 
Mat Feagai (born 2001), St George Illawarra Dragons; twin brother of Max
Max Feagai (born 2001), St George Illawarra Dragons; twin brother of Mat

Fennell family 
Dale Fennell (born 1957), Featherstone Rovers, Wakefield Trinity & Bradford Northern; son of Jackie
Jack Fennell (1933–2019), Featherstone Rovers; father of Dale

Fielden brothers 
Jamie Fielden (born 1978), London and Huddersfield Super League player
Stuart Fielden (born 1979), England and Great Britain international and Bradford/Wigan/Huddersfield Super League player

Fifita/Haumono family 
Andrew Fifita (born 1989), Tongan and Australian international, New South Wales Origin representative and Wests Tigers/Cronulla Sharks NRL player; nephew of Solomon Haumono, twin brother of David.
David Fifita (born 1989), Cronulla Sharks NRL player; nephew of Solomon Haumono, twin brother of Andrew.
David Fifita (born 2000), Queensland Origin representative and Brisbane Broncos NRL Player, cousin of Andrew and David Fifita.
Solomon Haumono (born 1975), Australian (SL) and Tongan international, New South Wales SL representative and Manly-Warringah/Canterbury-Bankstown/Balmain Tigers/St George and London Broncos player; uncle of Andrew and David.

Finch family 
Robert Finch (born 1956), St George NSWRFL player and former Director of NRL referees
Brett Finch (born 1981), New South Wales Origin representative, Canberra Raiders, Sydney Roosters, Parramatta Eels and Melbourne Storm NRL player and Wigan SL player; son of Robert

Fisher family 
Darryl Fisher, son of Kevin, former Western Suburbs player
Kevin Fisher, New Zealand international

Fisher brothers 
Idwal Fisher (1935–2012), Wales international, Warrington & Bradford Northern; brother of Tony
Tony Fisher (born 1943), GB & Wales international, Bradford Northern, Leeds & Castleford; brother of Idwal

Fitzgibbon family 
Allan Fitzgibbon, Balmain NSWRFL player and Illawarra Steelers coach; father of Craig
Craig Fitzgibbon (born 1977), Australian international, New South Wales Origin representative, Illawarra/St George Illawarra/Sydney Roosters NRL player and Hull F.C. SL player, NSW Country Origin coach; son of Allan

Flanagan of England 
Terry Flanagan, Great Britain international and Oldham RFL player; father of Mark
Mark Flanagan (born 1987), Wests Tigers player and son of Terry

Flanagan of Australia 
Shane Flanagan (born 1965), former St. George Dragons, Western Suburbs Magpies, Parramatta Eels NSWRL player and Cronulla-Sutherland Sharks NRL coach; father of Kyle.
Kyle Flanagan (born 1998), Cronulla-Sutherland Sharks NRL player; one of Shane.

Flynn brothers 
Adrian Flynn (born 1974), Wakefield Trinity, Castleford, Dewsbury, Featherstone Rovers & Batley Bulldogs; brother of Wayne
Wayne Flynn (born 1976), Wakefield Trinity & Sheffield Eagles; brother of Adrian

Fogerty family 
Terry Fogerty, Great Britain international player; father of Adam
Adam Fogerty, Halifax, St Helens and Warrington player; son of Terry

Folau family 
Tevita Folau (born 1995), Gold Coast Titans NRL player, cousin of Israel and John
Israel Folau (born 1989), dual Australian international, Queensland Maroons representative, Melbourne Storm and Brisbane Broncos NRL player; GWS Giants AFL player; NSW Waratahs Super Rugby player.
 John Folau ( b. 1994), Under 20s QLD Player and Parramatta Eels NYC Player, Waratahs player.

Foran brothers 
Liam Foran (born 1988), Melbourne Storm and Manly-Warringah NRL player, Salford and London SL player
Kieran Foran (born 1990), New Zealand International and Manly-Warringah/Parramatta/New Zealand Warriors NRL player

Fox brothers 
Don Fox (born 1935), English international, Featherstone Rovers and Wakefield Trinity RFL player
Neil Fox (born 1939), English international, Wakefield Trinity and Hull Kingston Rovers RFL player
Peter Fox (born 1933), Wakefield Trinity, Featherstone Rovers and Hull Kingston Rovers RFL player, and Great Britain national coach

French brothers 
Ian French (born 1960), Queensland representative, Wynnum-Manly BRL, Castleford RFL and North Sydney NSWRL player
Brett French (born 1962), Queensland representative, Wynnum-Manly BRL and North Sydney/Gold Coast NSWRL player

Frodsham family 
Alf Frodsham (1902–1974), GB & England, St Helens & St Helens Recs; brother of Eric & Harry
Eric Frodsham (1923–2003), St Helens & Warrington; brother of Alf & Harry
Harry Frodsham, St Helens; brother of Alf & Eric

Fry brothers 
Ed Fry (1879–1968), NSW, South Sydney & North Sydney; brother of Fred
Fred Fry (1885–1963), Eastern Suburbs and South Sydney; brother of Ed

Fulton family 
Bob Fulton, (1947–2021), Australian international player and coach, New South Wales representative and Manly-Warringah/Eastern Suburbs player and coach. Won 5 World Cups as a player and coach of Australia and 5 premierships with Manly-Warringah, Inaugural Rugby League Immortal; father of Scott and Brett
Scott Fulton (born 1973), Manly-Warringah player
Brett Fulton (born 1975), Manly-Warringah player

Furner family 
Don Furner, Sr. (born 1932), Australian international, Queensland representative and Toowoomba Souths player. Australian and Fijian international coach, Eastern Suburbs and Canberra Raiders NSWRL coach; father of David and Don, Jr.
David Furner (born 1971), Australian international, New South Wales representative and Canberra Raiders, Wigan Warriors and Leeds Rhinos player and former Canberra Raiders coach; son of Don and brother of Don, Jr.
Don Furner, Jr., Canberra Raiders CEO; son of Don, Sr. and brother of David

G

Gaffey family 
Len Gaffey, Cronulla-Sutherland NSWRFL player; father of Nigel
Nigel Gaffey (born 1970), Canberry, Eastern Suburbs, South Queensland and Penrith NRL player; son of Len

Galea brothers 
Brett Galea (born 1972); Brisbane Broncos and Adelaide Rams NRL player
Paul Galea (born 1970); Gold Coast Seagulls and North Queensland Cowboys ARL player

Gardner brothers 
Ade Gardner (born 1983), English international and Super League player
Mat Gardner (born 1985), Super League player

Gartner family 
Joe Gartner (1912–2002), Newtown Jets and Canterbury-Bankstown NSWRL player; father of Clive, Jim and Ray and great-uncle of Russel
Jim Gartner, Canterbury-Bankstown NSWRL player; son of Joe, brother of Clive and Ray and father of Russel
Clive Gartner, Canterbury-Bankstown NSWRL player; son of Joe, brother of Jim and Ray and uncle of Russel and father of Daniel
Ray Gartner (1934–1983), Canterbury-Bankstown NSWRL player; son of Joe, brother of Clive and Jim
Russel Gartner (born 1955), Australian international, New South Wales representative and Manly-Warringah/Eastern Suburbs/Balmain NSWRL player; son of Jim, nephew of Clive, great-nephew of Joe and uncle of Daniel
Daniel Gartner (born 1972), Australian representative and Manly-Warringah/Northern Eagles NRL and Bradford SL player; son of Clive and nephew of Russel

Gasnier family 
Reg Gasnier (1939–2014), Australian international, New South Wales representative and St. George NSWRFL player, inaugural Rugby League Immortal; uncle of Mark
Mark Gasnier (born 1981), Australian international, New South Wales representative and St. George Illawarra NRL player; nephew of Reg
Dennis Tutty (born 1945), Australian international, Balmain, Penrith & Eastern Suburbs; cousin of Reg
Ian Tutty, (born 1937), Australian Olympic rower; brother of Dennis & cousin of Reg

George family 
Wilf George, Halifax RLFC player and father of Marcus and Luke
Marcus George (born 1986), Halifax RLFC, Huddersfield Giants and Bradford Bulls player; son of Wilf and brother of Luke
Luke George (born 1987), Wakefield Trinity Wildcats player; son of Wilf and brother of Marcus

Geyer brothers 
Mark Geyer (born 1967), Australian international, New South Wales Origin representative and Penrith/Balmain/WA Reds player
Matt Geyer (born 1975), New South Wales Origin representative and Penrith/WA Reds/Melbourne Storm player

Gidley brothers 
Matt Gidley (born 1977), Australian international, New South Wales Origin representative and Newcastle Knights NRL and St Helens SL player
Kurt Gidley (born 1982), Australian international, New South Wales Origin representative and Newcastle Knights NRL player

Gilbert family 
Herb Gilbert, Sr. (1888–1972), Australian international and St. George NSWRFL player; father of Herb, Jr. and Jack
Herb Gilbert, Jr. (1917–1983), Balmain and St. George NSWRFL player; son of Herb, Sr. and brother of Jack
Jack Gilbert (1918–1998), St. George NSWRFL player; son of Herb, Sr. and brother of Herb, Jr.

Gillies brothers 
Ben Gillies, Canterbury Bulldogs ARL player
Simon Gillies (born 1969), New South Wales representative and Canterbury Bulldogs ARL player

Giteau family 
Ron Giteau (born 1955), Western Suburbs, Eastern Suburbs and Canberra player, father of:
Kristy Giteau (born 1981), dual-code Australia women's international.
 Kristy's younger brother Matt Giteau (born 1982) earned 92 caps with the Australia national rugby union team.

Gleeson family 
Martin Gleeson (born 1980), English international and Warrington Wolves player; brother of Mark and cousin of Sean
Mark Gleeson (born 1982) Warrington Wolves player; brother of Martin and cousin of Sean
Sean Gleeson (born 1987) Ireland international and Super League player; cousin of Martin and Mark

Goldspink family 
Kevin Goldspink, Kangaroo tourist 1967–68 and Canterbury/Easts player, father of Brett.
Brett Goldspink (born 1971), Illawarra/Souths/Western Reds/Oldham/Wigan/St Helens/Halifax player, son of Kevin.

Goodwin family 
Ted Goodwin (born 1953), Australian representative and NSWRFL player; father of Luke, Bronx and Bryson
Luke Goodwin (born 1973), Canterbury-Bankstown Bulldogs and New Zealand Māori representative player; son of Ted and brother of Bronx and Bryson
Bronx Goodwin (born 1984), New Zealand Māori representative and St George Illawarra Dragons NRL player; son of Ted and brother of Luke and Bryson
Bryson Goodwin (born 1985) Canterbury-Bankstown Bulldogs/South Sydney Rabbitohs NRL player; son of Ted and brother of Luke and Bronx

Gordon cousins 
Ashley Gordon (born 1969), Newcastle Knights and Penrith Panthers NRL player; second cousin of Isaac
Isaac Gordon (born 1986), Cronulla-Sutherland Sharks NRL player; second cousin of Ashley

Gore family 
Billy Gore (1919–2010), St Helens & Warrington; son of Jack
Jack Gore (1899–1971), GB & Wales international, Salford & Wigan Highfield; father of Billy

Gorley brothers 
Les Gorley (born 1950), Great Britain and England international, and Workington Town and Widnes RFL player
Peter Gorley (born 1951), Great Britain and England international, and Workington Town and St Helens RFL player

Goulding family 
Bobbie Goulding (born 1972), GB & England, St Helens, Wigan, Leeds, Widnes, Wakefield Trinity, Huddersfield, Leigh, Rochdale Hornets & Barrow Raiders; father of Bobbie Jr.
Bobbie Goulding Jr. (born 1993), Wakefield Trinity & Sydney Roosters; son of Bobbie

Gourley family 
Robin Gourley (born 1935), New South Wales representative and St. George NSWRFL player; father of Scott
Scott Gourley (born 1968), dual Australian rugby international, New South Wales Origin representative and St. George and Sydney Roosters NSWRL player; son of Robin

Graham family 
Brian Graham, New South Wales representative and St. George NSWRFL player; father of Philip
Philip Graham, St. George NSWRFL player; son of Brian

Greenwood brothers 
James Greenwood (born 1991), South Wales Scorpions, Wigan Warriors, Hull KR & Salford Red Devils; brother of Joe
Joe Greenwood (born 1993), St Helens, Gold Coast Titans, Wigan Warriors, Huddersfield Giants; brother of James

Grésèque family 
Ivan Grésèque, French international and coach, father of Maxime
Maxime Grésèque, French international, son of Ivan

Grey family 
Eric Grey, New Zealand international 1920
Ian Grey, New Zealand international 1954–6; son of Eric

Griffin brothers 
Darrell Griffin (born 1981), English international and Wakefield Trinity Wildcats player
Josh Griffin (born 1990), Wakefield Trinity Wildcats player
George Griffin (born 1992), Hull KR, London Broncos, Salford & Castleford; youngest brother of both Darrell & Josh

Grix brothers 
Scott Grix (born 1984), Ireland international and Halifax and Warrington player
Simon Grix (born 1985), Halifax and Warrington player

Grothe family 
Eric Grothe, Sr. (born 1960), Australian international, New South Wales representative and Parramatta Eels player; father of Eric, Jr.
Eric Grothe, Jr. (born 1980), Australian international, New South Wales representative and Parramatta/Sydney Roosters/Cronulla player; son of Eric, Sr.

H

Hagan brothers 
Bob Hagan (born 1940), Australian international, Queensland representative and Canterbury-Bankstown NSWRL player; former Canterbury-Bankstown RLFC chairman
Michael Hagan (born 1964), Queensland Origin representative, Canterbury-Bankstown and Newcastle Knights NSWRL player, Newcastle NRL premiership coach and Parramatta coach

Haggerty family 
Roy Haggerty, Great Britain international player; father of Gareth and Kurt
Gareth Haggerty, Ireland international player; son of Roy, brother of Kurt
Kurt Haggerty, Ireland international player; son of Roy, brother of Gareth

Hambly family 
Brian Hambly (1938–2008), Australian international, New South Wales representative, Wagga Wagga and South Sydney NSWRFL player; cousin of Gary
Gary Hambly (born 1956), New South Wales representative, Wagga Wagga and South Sydney NSWRFL player; cousin of Brian

Hanley family 
Ellery Hanley (born 1961), GB & England international, Leeds, Bradford, Balmain, Western Suburbs & Wigan player; father of Umyla
Umyla Hanley (born 2002), Wigan Warriors Super League player; son of Ellery

Hardgrave family 
Arthur Hardgrave, New Zealand international 1912–14
Roy Hardgrave, New Zealand international 1928; son of Arthur

Hardy family 
Nelson 'Bill' Hardy (1906–1993), Australian international and Eastern Suburbs Roosters player; father of Kevin and Don and grandfather of Steve
Kevin Hardy, Eastern Suburbs Roosters player; son of Nelson, brother of Don and (uncle or father) of Steve
Don Hardy, Eastern Suburbs Roosters player; son of Nelson, brother of Kevin and (uncle or father) of Steve
Steve Hardy, Eastern Suburbs Roosters player; grandson of Nelson

Harkin family 
Kevin Harkin (born 1952), Wakefield Trinity, York Wasps, & Hull FC; cousin of Paul & Terry
Paul Harkin (born 1958), Bradford Northern, Featherstone Rovers, Hull KR, Leeds, Halifax RLFC & Hunslet; brother of Terry
Terry Harkin (born 1951), Wakefield Trinity; brother of Paul & cousin of Kevin

Harris family (1) 
Norman Harris (c. 1918–2007), Wales international player; grandfather of Iestyn
Iestyn Harris (born 1976), Great Britain and dual Welsh rugby international, Warrington, Leeds and Bradford SL player, Salford Reds and Celtic Crusaders coach and Welsh international coach; grandson of Norman

Harris family (2) 
Billy Harris (born 1951), Featherstone Rovers, Oldham RLFC & Wakefield Trinity; younger brother of Graham
Graham Harris (born 1946), Featherstone Rovers; older brother of Billy

Harrison brothers 
Bill Harrison, New Zealand international
Rata Harrison, New Zealand international

Hastings family 
Jackson Hastings, Sydney Roosters/Manly-Warringah player; son of Kevin
Kevin Hastings, Sydney Roosters player; father of Jackson

Hauraki family 
Iwi Hauraki, Greek international, Sydney Roosters player; cousin of Weller
Weller Hauraki, Parramatta Eels player; cousin of Iwi

Hayne/Thompson family 
Jarryd Hayne (born 1988), Fiji and Australian international, New South Wales representative and Parramatta/Gold Coast Titans NRL player and San Francisco 49ers NFL player; son of Manoa Thompson
Manoa Thompson (born 1968), Fiji international, South Sydney/Western Suburbs/Auckland Warriors NSWRL player; father of Jarryd Hayne

Hayward brothers 
Harold Hayward, New Zealand international
Morgan Hayward, New Zealand international

Heidke family 
Bill Heidke, Australian international captain and Queensland representative player; brother of Harold and father of Les
Harold Heidke, Australian international and Queensland representative player; brother of Bill and uncle of Les
Les "Monty" Heidke, Australian international player; son of Bill and nephew of Harold

Henderson brothers 
Andrew Henderson (born 1979), Scotland international, NRL and Super League player
Kevin Henderson (born 1980), Scotland international, NRL and Super League player
Ian Henderson (born 1983), Scotland international, NRL and Super League player

Henry brothers 
Whare Henry, New Zealand international
Whetu Henry, New Zealand international

Hetherington family 
Jason Hetherington (born 1970), Australia international, Queensland, Gold Coast Seagulls, Canterbury& London Broncos; father of Kobe
Kobe Hetherington (born 1999), Brisbane Broncos; son of Jason

Higgins brothers 
Alec Higgins, Great Britain international
Fred Higgins, Great Britain international

Higson family 
John Higson (1887–1958), Hunslet, Huddersfield, Featherstone Rovers & Wakefield Trinity; father of Len
Len Higson (1908–1974), England & Yorkshire, Wakefield Trinity, Leeds & Bradford Northern; son of John

Hill brothers 
Cliff Hill, Great Britain international
David Hill, Great Britain international

Hindmarsh brothers 
Ian Hindmarsh (born 1977), Parramatta Eels and Canberra Raiders NRL player
Nathan Hindmarsh (born 1979) Australian international and Parramatta Eels NRL player

Hodges family 
Justin Hodges, Australian international, Queensland State of Origin representative and Brisbane Broncos/Sydney Roosters NRL player; cousin of Jayden
Jayden Hodges, North Queensland and Manly-Warringah NRL player; cousin of Justin

Hoffman family 
Jay Hoffman (born 1958), Queensland representative and Canberra Raiders NSWRL player; father of Ryan
Ryan Hoffman (born 1984), Australian international and Melbourne Storm NRL player; son of Jay

Holliday family 
Bill Holliday – Cumbrian forward from the 1960s & '70s for Great Britain and at club level for Whitehaven, Hull Kingston Rovers, Swinton & Rochdale Hornets.
Les Holliday – forward, son of Bill Holliday, from the 1980s & '90s for Great Britain and at club level for Swinton, Halifax, Widnes and Dewsbury.
 Mike Holliday – forward, son of Bill Holliday, from the 1980s who played at club level for Swinton and Leigh.

Hopoate family 
John Hopoate (born 1974), Tongan and Australian international, New South Wales representative and Manly-Warringah/Balmain/Northern Eagles/Wests Tigers NRL player
Albert Hopoate (born 1985), Sydney Roosters NRL player and brother of John
William Hopoate (born 1992), New South Wales representative, Manly-Warringah/Parramatta/Canterbury NRL player, son of John and nephew of Albert
Jamil Hopoate (born 1994), Brisbane Broncos NRL player, son of John and nephew of Albert

Horder brothers 
Clarrie Horder (1890–1960), Queensland representative and South Sydney NSWRFL player
Harold Horder (1894–1978), Australian international, Queensland representative and South Sydney NSWRFL player

Horne brothers 
Richard Horne (born 1982), English international and Hull Super League player
Graeme Horne (born 1985), Hull Super League player

Horo brothers 
Shane Horo (born 1960), New Zealand international and Leigh Centurions/Castleford Tigers RFL player; brother of Mark and uncle of Justin
Mark Horo (born 1963), New Zealand international and Parramatta/Western Suburbs/Auckland Warriors player; brother of Shane and father of Justin
Justin Horo (born 1986), New Zealand Māori representative, Parramatta Eels/Manly-Warringah NRL player and Catalans SL player; son of Mark and nephew of Shane

Howard brothers 
Daniel Howard, brother of Stephen, USA international
Stephen Howard, brother of Daniel, USA international

Huddart family 
Dick Huddart (1936–2021), Great Britain and England international representative (UK club level for Whitehaven and St. Helens) and RFL and NSWRFL player; father of Milton
Milton Huddart (1960–2015), England international and RFL player; son of Dick

Hughes/Moore family 
Garry Hughes (born 1952), Canterbury-Bankstown player and administrator; brother of Graeme and Mark and father of Glen, Steven and Corey. Nephew of Peter Moore and cousin of Kevin Moore.
Mark Hughes (born 1954), Canterbury-Bankstown player; brother of Graeme and Garry. Nephew of Peter Moore and cousin of Kevin Moore.
Graeme Hughes (born 1955), New South Wales representative in both cricket and rugby league. Canterbury-Bankstown player; brother of Mark and Garry. Nephew of Peter Moore and cousin of Kevin Moore.
Glen Hughes (born 1973), Canterbury-Bankstown player; son of Garry, brother of Steven and Corey and second cousin of Kevin Moore.
Steven Hughes (born 1974), Canterbury-Bankstown player; son of Garry, brother of Glen and Corey and second cousin of Kevin Moore.
Corey Hughes (born 1978), Canterbury-Bankstown player; son of Garry, brother of Glen and Steven and second cousin of Kevin Moore.
Peter "Bullfrog" Moore (1932–2001), Canterbury-Bankstown administrator; father of Kevin Moore, uncle of Garry, Mark and Graeme Hughes, great-uncle of Glen, Steven and Corey Hughes.
Kevin Moore (born 1965) Canterbury-Bankstown player and coach; son of Peter Moore, cousin of Garry, Mark and Graeme Hughes, second cousin of Glen, Steven and Corey Hughes.

Hulme family 
David Hulme, Widnes, Leeds, Salford and Great Britain
Paul Hulme, Widnes, Warrington, Great Britain, younger brother of David
Danny Hulme, Widnes, North Wales Crusaders, Toulouse Olympique, son of David
Liam Hulme, Widnes, North Wales Crusaders, Warrington, Swinton son of Paul

Humphreys family 
Kevin Humphreys (1930–2010), NSWRFL player and later chairman; father of Stephen
Stephen Humphreys, CEO of the Wests Tigers; son of Kevin

I

Iro brothers 
Tony Iro (born 1967), New Zealand international player, Wigan/Leigh RFL player and Manly-Warringah/Eastern Suburbs/Hunter/Adelaide/South Sydney NRL player and Auckland coach; brother of Kevin
Kevin Iro (born 1968), New Zealand and Cook Islands international player, Wigan/Leeds/St Helens RFL player and Manly-Warringah/Hunter/Auckland NRL player; brother of Tony
Kayal Iro (born 2000), Cook Islands international player, New Zealand Warriors NRL player, son of Kevin and nephew of Tony

Isemonger family 
Sam Isemonger, Cronulla Sharks and St. George Illawarra Dragons player; son of David
David Isemonger, Cronulla Sharks player; father of Sam

Ives brothers 
Clarrie Ives (1890–1956), Australian international, New South Wales representative and NSWRFL player
Bill Ives (1896–1975), New South Wales representative and NSWRFL player

Izzard brothers 
Brad Izzard (born 1965), New South Wales State of Origin and Penrith Panthers NSWRL player
Craig Izzard, Penrith Panthers and Illawarra Steelers NSWRL player
Grant Izzard, Penrith Panthers and Illawarra Steelers NSWRL player

J

Jennings brothers 
George Jennings (born 1993), Penrith/Parramatta NRL player
Michael Jennings (born 1988), Tongan and Australian international, New South Wales Origin representative, Penrith/Sydney Roosters/Parramatta NRL player
Robert Jennings (born 1996), Penrith/South Sydney NRL player

Johns family 
Matthew Johns (born 1971), Australian international; New South Wales Origin representative; Newcastle/Cronulla-Sutherland NRL player and Wigan SL player, brother of Andrew and father of Jack and Cooper
Andrew Johns (born 1974), Australian international; New South Wales Origin representative; Newcastle Knights player. 8th Rugby League Immortal, brother of Matthew and uncle of Jack
 Jack Johns (born 1997), Italian international, son of Matthew and nephew of Andrew
 Cooper Johns (born 1999), Son of Matthew and nephew of Andrew

Jordan family 
Len Jordan, New Zealand international 1946–9
Chris Jordan, New Zealand international 1977–8; son of Len

Junee family 
Kevin Junee, Australian international, New South Wales representative and Eastern Suburbs/Manly-Warringah NSWRFL player; father of Darren
Darren Junee, Eastern Suburbs NSWRL player and son of Kevin

K

Karalius brothers 
Terence Karalius, Liverpool City player
Vince Karalius (1932–2008), British international and St Helens and Widnes player
Denis Karalius, St Helens player
Tony Karalius, St Helens and Widnes player

Kaufusi brothers 
Antonio Kaufusi, Melbourne Storm, North Queensland Cowboys, Newcastle Knights, London Broncos, Huddersfield Giants, Bradford Bulls and Canterbury-Bankstown Bulldogs player
Felise Kaufusi, Melbourne Storm player
Patrick Kaufusi, North Queensland Cowboys player

Keating brothers 
Kris Keating (born 1988), Parramatta Eels, Canterbury & Hull KR; brother of Matthew
Matt Keating (born 1986), Parramatta Eels; brother of Kris

Keato brothers 
Bill Keato, Western Suburbs NSWRFL player
Alan Keato, Western Suburbs NSWRFL player

Kellett family 
Brian Kellett (born 1959), Featherstone Rovers & Mansfield Marksman; son of Cyril
Cyril Kellett (1937–1993), Hull KR & Featherstone Rovers; father of Brian
David Kellett, Featherstone Rovers; brother of Cyril

Kelly brothers 
Andy Kelly, Wakefield Trinity player and coach, and Dewsbury and Featherstone Rovers coach
Neil Kelly (born 1962), Wakefield Trinity, Dewsbury, Hunslet and Featherstone Rovers player
Richard Kelly, Wakefield Trinity and Dewsbury player

Kimmorley brothers 
Craig Kimmorley (born 1974), Newcastle Knights, Adelaide Rams and Sydney City Roosters NRL player
Brett Kimmorley (born 1976), Australian international, New South Wales Origin representative and Newcastle Knights/Hunter Mariners/Melbourne Storm/Northern Eagles/Cronulla Sharks/Canterbury-Bankstown NRL player

King family (1) 
John King, Penrith NSWRFL player; father of Cameron
Cameron King, St. George Illawarra Dragons NRL player; son of John

King family (2) 
Cec King, South Sydney NSWRFL player; father of Johnny
Johnny King, St. George Dragons NSWRFL player; son of Cec, father of David
David King, Gold Coast Seagulls NSWRFL player; son of Johnny
 Max King, Gold Coast Titans, Melbourne Storm player; son of David, grandson of Johnny, great-grandson of Cec

King family (3) 
Andrew King (born 1975), Gold Coast Chargers, Manly Sea Eagles, Northern Eagles & South Sydney ;brother of Chris & Matt
Chris King (born 1969), Paramatta Eels ;brother of Andrew & Matt
Matt King (born 1980), Melbourne Storm, Warrington Wolves& South Sydney Rabbitohs; brother of Chris & Andrew

Klein family 
 Russell Klein, Fortitude Valleys Diehards BRL player, father of Callum and Rowan
 Callum Klein, Former ISC Sunshine Coast Falcons player, Valleys Diehard Player, son of Russell and brother of Rowan.
 Rowan Klein, Former ISC Sunshine Coast Falcons player, Valleys Diehard Player, son of Russell and brother of Callum

Kirwan family 
Jack Kirwan, Auckland and New Zealand representative player; grandfather of John
John Kirwan, Auckland Warriors player; grandson of Jack

Kouparitsas brothers 
Kosta Kouparitsas, Greek international and Sydney Roosters player
Nick Kouparitsas, Greek international and Canterbury-Bankstown Bulldogs and Sydney Roosters player

Krewanty family 
Alex Krewanty, brother of Arnold and Julius, PNG International
Arnold Krewanty, brother of Alex and Julius, PNG International
Julius Krewanty, brother of Alex and Arnold, PNG International

L

Laing brothers 
Bert Laing, New Zealand international
Albert Laing, New Zealand international

Lane brothers 
Brett Lane, Canterbury-Bankstown Bulldogs NRL player
Shaun Lane, Canterbury-Bankstown/New Zealand Warriors/Manly-Warringah/Parramatta NRL player

Lang family 
John Lang (born 1950), Australian international and Queensland representative player, Cronulla, Penrith and South Sydney coach; father of Martin
Martin Lang (born 1975), Queensland representative player; played his whole club career under the coaching of his father, John

Langley family 
John Langley, Leeds player; father of Jamie
Jamie Langley, Great Britain international representative and Bradford Super League player; son of John

Laurie brothers 
Robert "Rocky" Laurie, Eastern Suburbs NSWRL player
Mark Laurie, Parramatta NSWRL player

Law brothers 
Graham Law, Wakefield Trinity Wildcats player
Neil Law, Northampton Saints (RU), Sheffield Eagles, and Wakefield Trinity Wildcats player

Lazarus family 
Glenn Lazarus (born 1965), Australian international, New South Wales representative and Canberra Raiders, Brisbane Broncos and Melbourne Storm NRL player; uncle of Blake
Blake Lazarus (born 1988), Wests Tigers NRL player; nephew of Glenn

Lester brothers 
Aaron Lester, Auckland Warriors and Whitehaven player
Stuart Lester, Wigan Warriors player

Leuluai family 
James and Phillip's parents were born in Samoa, though the family is now settled in South Auckland. James and Thomas' combined total of 58 Tests (as of November 2011) is thought to be a world record for a father and son combination.
 James Leuluai (born 1957), New Zealand international player, brother of Phillip, father of Thomas and Macgraff, uncle of Kylie
 Phillip Leuluai (born 1977), Samoa international player, brother of James, uncle of Thomas, Macgraff, and Kylie
 Kylie Leuluai (born 1978), New Zealand Māori representative, Samoa international player, nephew of James and Phillip, cousin of Thomas and Macgraff
 Thomas Leuluai (born 1985), New Zealand international player, Wigan Warriors player, son of James, nephew of Phillip, brother of Macgraff, cousin of Kylie
 Macgraff Leuluai (born 1990), Widnes Vikings player, son of James, nephew of Phillip, brother of Thomas, cousin of Kylie

Lindwall brothers 
Ray Lindwall (1921–1996), St. George NSWRFL player
Jack Lindwall, St. George NSWRFL player

Lomax brothers 
John Lomax, New Zealand international
David Lomax, New Zealand international

Lousi brothers 
Sam Lousi, brother of Sione, New Zealand Warriors player
Sione Lousi, brother of Sam, New Zealand Warriors player

Lowe brothers 
Ben Lowe (born 1985), South Sydney Rabbitohs; brother of Jaiman
Jaiman Lowe (born 1983), N Queensland Cowboys, South Sydney Rabbitohs & Melbourne Storm; brother of Ben

Lulia brothers 
Keith Lulia, brother of Lulia, Cook Islands international
Lulia Lulia, brother of Keith, Cook Islands international

Lumsden brothers 
Eddie Lumsden (born 1936), Australian international and New South Wales representative, Manly-Warringah and St George NSWRFL player
Jack Lumsden (born 1931), Australian international representative and Manly-Warringah NSWRFL player

M

MacDougall brothers 
Gil MacDougall, Balmain Tigers and Western Suburbs Magpies NSWRFL player and father of Adam, Ben, Scott, and Luke
Adam MacDougall (born 1975), Australian international and Newcastle Knights and South Sydney Rabbitohs NRL player
Ben MacDougall (born 1977), Manly-Warringah Sea Eagles, Melbourne Storm, Newcastle Knights NRL player
 Scott MacDougall (born 1980), St George Illawarra NRL player.
Luke MacDougall (born 1982), Newcastle Knights and South Sydney Rabbitohs NRL player
Garry MacDougall (born 1938) St George
Graeme MacDougall (born 1940) St George, Australian Wallabies (1961–62), Balmain Tigers
Stuart MacDougall (born 1947) St George, Australian Wallabies (1973–76)

Maddison brothers 
Ken Maddison (born 1946), Australian international and St. George/Cronulla NSWRFL player
Keith Maddison, St. George NSWRFL player

Malone/Renouf family 
Steve Renouf (born 1970), Australian international and Queensland Origin representative. Brisbane Broncos NRL and Wigan SL player; uncle of Donald
Donald Malone (born 1985), North Queensland Cowboys NRL player; nephew of Steve

Mann family 
Don Mann, New Zealand international player; father of Duane and Don Jr
Duane Mann (born 1965), New Zealand & Tongan international player, Warrington RLFC player; son of Don
Esau Mann, Tonga international player
Don Mann, Jr. New Zealand Warriors football manager; son of Don
George Mann, New Zealand & Tongan international; cousin of Duane

Mannah brothers 
Jon Mannah (1989–2013) Cronulla-Sutherland Sharks NRL player
Tim Mannah (born 1988) Parramatta Eels NRL player

Mara family 
Bob Mara, Balmain NSWRFL player; father of Gary
Gary Mara (1962–2012), Balmain NSWRL player; son of Bob
Les Mara (1975–82), NSWRFL player for Balmain, South Sydney, Newtown; City NSW; New South Wales; Rugby Football League Championship player for St Helens RFC; nephew of Bob Mara

Maranta family 
Barry Maranta, co-founder of the Brisbane Broncos
Lachlan Maranta, Brisbane Broncos NRL player – Father is Brett Plowman, Brisbane Broncos Player

March twins 
David March (born 1979), Wakefield Trinity and York player
Paul March (born 1979), Wakefield Trinity and York player

Martyn family 
Mick Martyn, Great Britain international, older brother of Thomas Martyn, and uncle of Tommy Martyn
Thomas Martyn, England international, younger brother of Mick Martyn, and father of Tommy Martyn
Tommy Martyn, Ireland international, son of Thomas Martyn, and nephew of Mick Martyn.

Mata'utia brothers 
Peter Mata'utia (born 1990), Samoan international, Newcastle Knights, St. George Illawarra, Leigh, and Castleford player
Chanel Mata'utia (born 1992), Newcastle Knights player
Pat Mata'utia (born 1993), Newcastle Knights player
Sione Mata'utia (born 1996), Australian and Samoan international, Newcastle Knights and St. Helens player

A cousin, Masada Iosefa (1988–2021), was a Samoan international who played for Penrith and the Wests Tigers.

May brothers 
Tyrone May (born 1996), Samoan international, Penrith Panthers, and Catalans Dragons player
Taylan May (born 2001), Penrith Panthers player
Terrell May, Sydney Roosters Senior Representative player

McCabe brothers 
Paul McCabe (born 1959), Australian international and Queensland representative player
John McCabe, Queensland representative player

McCarthy family 
Bob McCarthy, Australian international and South Sydney NSWRFL player
Darren McCarthy, Canterbury-Bankstown NSWRL player
Troy McCarthy, Gold Coast Chargers NSWRL Player

McClennan family 
Mike McClennan, New Zealand-born St. Helens RFL coach; father of Brian
Brian McClennan, New Zealand-born Leeds Super League coach; son of Mike

McCormack family 
Jim McCormack, Oldham Rugby Football League player; father of Steve
Steve McCormack, Widnes Vikings Super League and Scotland international representative coach; son of Jim

McCracken family 
Ken McCracken, New Zealand international player and father of Jarrod
Jarrod McCracken (born 1970), New Zealand international; Canterbury-Bankstown Bulldogs, Parramatta Eels and Wests Tigers player; and son of Ken

McCaffery family 
Ken McCaffery, Australian international and North Sydney NSWRL player; father of Paul
Paul McCaffery, North Sydney NSWRL player; son of Ken
David McCaffery, North Sydney NSWRL player; son of Ken
Michael McCaffery, North Sydney NSWRL player; son of Ken

McGregor family 
Dick McGregor, All Black international
Dougie McGregor, All Black and Kiwis international
John McGregor, brother of Dougie, played for Auckland
Eric McGregor, brother of Dougie and John, played for Auckland
Ron McGregor, Kiwis international, NZRL Chairman and President and IRLB Secretary

McGuinness brothers 
Ken McGuinness (born 1975), New South Wales Origin representative, Western Suburbs/Wests Tigers/North Queensland NRL player
Kevin McGuinness (born 1976), Western Suburbs/Wests Tigers/Manly Warringah NRL player and Salford SL player

1st McKinnon family 
Harry McKinnon, North Sydney NSWRFL player, coach and administrator; brother of Don, Sr. and father of Doug and Max and Don, Jr
Don McKinnon, Sr., North Sydney NSWRFL player; brother of Harry and uncle of Doug, Max and Don, Jr.
Doug McKinnon, North Sydney NSWRFL player; son of Harry, nephew of Don, Sr. and brother of Max and Don Jr
Max McKinnon, North Sydney NSWRFL player; son of Harry nephew of Don, Sr. and brother of Doug and Don, Jr.
Don McKinnon (born 1955), Australian international and North Sydney/Manly Warringah NSRWFL player; Son of Harry, nephew of Don, Sr. and brother of Doug and Max

2nd McKinnon family 
Ross McKinnon, Australian international and NSWRFL player; grandfather of Wade
Wade McKinnon (born 1981), NRL player and grandson of Ross

McRitchie family 
Doug McRitchie, Australian international, New South Wales interstate, and St. George NSWRFL player; brother of Bill
Bill McRitchie, St. George NSWRFL player; brother of Doug

Mellars family 
Peter Mellars, New Zealand international and father of Vince
Vince Mellars, NRL and Super League professional, son of Peter

Messenger brothers 
Dally Messenger (1889–1959), Australian international and Eastern Suburbs NSWRFL player
Wally Messenger (1891–1961), Australian international and Eastern Suburbs NSWRFL player

Millard brothers 
 Ryan Millard, brother of Daryl, Fijian international
 Daryl Millard, brother of Ryan, Fijian international

Mills family 
'Big Jim' Mills, Great Britain and Wales international, and Widnes RFL player; father of David
David Mills, Wales international and Widnes Super League player; son of Jim

Mincham family 
William Mincham, Auckland representative, and international referee, father of Ted, grandfather of Bob
Ted Mincham, New Zealand international 1935–6
Bob Mincham, New Zealand international 1966–8; son of Ted

Minichiello brothers 
Anthony Minichiello (born 1980), Australian and Italian international, New South Wales representative and Sydney Roosters NRL player
Mark Minichiello (born 1982), Italian international, Sydney Roosters, South Sydney and Gold Coast Titans NRL player

Minto family 
Matt Minto, Newcastle Knights player; nephew of Scott
Scott Minto, Brisbane Broncos and North Queensland Cowboys player; uncle of Matt

Mitchell brothers 
Alf Mitchell, New Zealand international
George Mitchell, New Zealand international

Moliner family 
Jacques Moliner (born 1967), France international and  Lezignan, Catalan, Penrith & Pamiers XIII player, father of Cyril
Cyril Moliner, St Gaudens Bears player

Monaghan brothers 
Michael Monaghan (born 1980), Canberra Raiders and Manly NRL player, Warrington Wolves Super League player
Joel Monaghan (born 1982), Australian international, Canberra Raiders NRL player and Warrington Wolves Super League player

Morley brothers 
Adrian Morley (born 1977), GB & England, Leeds Rhinos, Sydney Roosters, Warrington Wolves & Salford; brother of Chris
Chris Morley (born 1973), St Helens, Warrington Wolves, Salford, Sheffield Eagles, Oldham RLFC, Halifax RLFC & Swinton; brother of Adrian

Morris family 

Steve Morris (born 1957) Australian international, New South Wales representative, and St. George/Eastern Suburbs NSWRFL player; father of twins Brett and Josh.
Brett Morris (born 1986) Australian international, New South Wales representative, and St. George Illawarra/Canterbury-Bankstown/Sydney NRL player
Josh Morris (born 1986) Australian international, New South Wales representative, and St. George Illawarra/Canterbury-Bankstown/Cronulla-Sutherland/Sydney NRL player

Mortimer family 
Mortimer brothers
Steve Mortimer (born 1956), Australian international, New South Wales representative and Canterbury-Bankstown NSWRL player; brother of Peter, Chris and Glen, and uncle of Daniel
Peter Mortimer (born 1957), New South Wales representative and Canterbury-Bankstown NSWRL player; brother of Steve, Chris and Glen, and father of Daniel
Chris Mortimer (born 1958), Australian international, New South Wales representative and Canterbury-Bankstown NSWRL player; brother of Steve, Peter and Glen, and uncle of Daniel
Glen Mortimer, Cronulla-Sutherland NSWRL player; brother of Steve, Peter and Chris, and uncle of Daniel
Daniel Mortimer (born 1989), Sydney Roosters NRL player; son of Peter, nephew of Steve, Chris and Glen.

Moses brothers 
Dai Moses – forward in the 1940s, 1950s and 1960s for Wales and at club level for Salford and Swinton.
Glyn Moses – full back in the 1940s and 1950s for Great Britain and at club level for Salford and St. Helens

Mountford brothers 
Cecil Mountford (1919–2009), International representative and Wigan RFL player
Bill Mountford, New Zealand representative player
Ken Mountford, New Zealand representative player

Mueller brothers 
Blake Mueller – Newcastle NRL player
Brock Mueller – Newcastle NRL player

Mullane family 
Mick Mullane Sr., New South Wales representative and Newtown Jets player; father of Mick Jr and Greg
Greg Mullane, Canterbury and Cronulla player; Brother of Mick Jr
Mick Mullane Jr., Cronulla player; Brother of Greg and father of Jye
Jye Mullane, Cronulla and Manly player; Son of Mick Jr

Mullen family 
Jarrod Mullen, New South Wales representative and Newcastle Knights player; son of Steve
Steve Mullen, Canterbury and Western Suburbs player; father of Jarrod

Mullins family 
Bill Mullins, New South Wales representative and Eastern Suburbs Roosters NSWRFL player; brother of Russell and Terry, and father of Brett
Russell Mullins, Western Suburbs & Penrith NSWRFL player; brother of Bill and Terry, and uncle of Brett
Terry Mullins, Western Suburbs NSWRFL player; brother of Bill and Russell, and uncle of Brett
Brett Mullins (born 1972), Australian international, New South Wales representative and Canberra Raiders and Sydney Roosters NRL player; son of Bill and nephew of Russell and Terry

Mundine family 
Mickey Mundine, Aboriginal Australian team representative player; uncle of Anthony
Anthony Mundine (born 1975), Boxer, New South Wales State of Origin and St. George Illawarra NRL player; cousin of Beau
Beau Mundine (born 1980), South Sydney NRL player; uncle of Anthony
Tony Mundine (born 1951), boxer and Father of Anthony
Wes Patten (born 1974), Balmain, Gold Coast, South Sydney and St George Illawarra NRL player; cousin of Anthony, Amos and Robbie
Robbie Simpson Rugby league player with St. George, and cousin of Anthony, Robbie and Wes
Rod Silva (born 1967), Eastern Suburbs and Canterbury Bulldogs player; Uncle of all of the above
Buddy Gordon (born 1987), South Sydney, Canterbury and Penrith NRL player; Cousin of all of the above

Myler family 
Frank Myler, Great Britain international, Widnes and St Helens RFL player, and Widnes RFL coach
John Myler, Widnes RFL player; brother of Tony and father of Stephen
Tony Myler, Great Britain international, Widnes RFL and Balmain NSWRL player, and Widnes RFL coach; uncle of Stephen
Colin Myler, Super League administrator
Stephen Myler (born 1984), St Helens, Widnes Vikings and Salford City Reds Super League player; nephew of Tony
Vinny Myler Salford and Bradford Bulls Super League player; nephew of Tony
Richard Myler (born 1990), Widnes Vikings, Salford City Reds and Warrington Wolves Super League player -not a relation to the above. Is a relation to Widnes and Great Britain 2nd row Doug Laughton;

N

Nable brothers 
Adam Nable (born 1975), Manly-Warringah, Balmain, Wests Tigers and North Queensland NRL player, Wakefield Trinity SL player.
Matt Nable (born 1972), Manly-Warringah and South Sydney NSWRL player, Carlisle and London Broncos player. Actor.

Naiqama brothers 
Kevin Naiqama, Fijian international, Newcastle Knights and Wests Tigers player
Wes Naiqama, Fijian international, St George-Illawarra Dragons Newcastle Knights player

Narvo family 
Herb Narvo, Australian international representative, and Newtown and St. George NSWRFL player; father of Frank
Frank Narvo, Newtown and St. George NSWRFL player; son of Herb

Naughton brothers 
Johnny Naughton, Widnes RFL player
Albert Naughton, Great Britain representative and Widnes RFL player
Danny Naughton, Great Britain representative and Widnes RFL player

Newlove family 
John Newlove, England international, Featherstone Rovers and Hull FC player; father of Paul, Richard & Shaun
Paul Newlove, Featherstone Rovers, Bradford, Saint Helens, Castleford Tigers, Great Britain & Ireland.
Richard Newlove, Featherstone Rovers, Wakefield Trinity, Doncaster, Sheffield Eagles.
Shaun Newlove, Featherstone Rovers

Norman brothers 
Ray Norman (1889–1971), Australian international, New South Wales representative and Annandale, South Sydney and Eastern Suburbs NSWRFL player
Rex Norman (1891–1961), Australian international, New South Wales representative and Annandale, South Sydney and Eastern Suburbs NSWRFL player
Roy Norman, Annandale NSWRFL player
Bernard Norman, Annandale NSWRFL player

O

O'Connell brothers 
Wally O'Connell (born 1923), Australian and New South Wales representative, Eastern Suburbs and Manly-Warringah NSWRFL player. Manly-Warringah coach
Barry O'Connell, Eastern Suburbs and Manly-Warringah NSWRFL player
Ron O'Connell, Queensland country player

1st O'Connor brothers 
Alf O'Connor, Australian international, New South Wales representative, South Sydney Rabbitohs player; older brother of Frank
Frank O'Connor, Australian international, New South Wales representative, South Sydney Rabbitohs player; younger brother of Alf

2nd O'Connor family 
Jarrod O'Connor (born 2001), Leeds Rhinos Super League player; son of Terry
Terry O'Connor (born 1971), GB & Ireland international, Wigan, Salford & Widnes player, TV broadcaster; father of Jarrod

O'Donnell brothers 
Luke O'Donnell (born 1980), Australian international, New South Wales representative, Balmain/Wests Tigers/North Queensland/Sydney Roosters NRL player and Huddersfield SL player; older brother of Kyle
Kyle O'Donnell (born 1990), Newcastle Knights and Canberra Raiders NRL player; younger brother of Luke

O'Loughlin family 
Kevin O'Loughlin, Wigan player; brother of Keiron, uncle of Sean
Keiron O'Loughlin, Lancashire representative and Wigan player; father of Sean
Sean O'Loughlin, Great Britain and England representative, and Wigan player; son of Keiron

Orchard brothers 
Phillip Orchard, New Zealand international
Robert Orchard, New Zealand international and Queensland representative player

Oxford family 
 Arthur Oxford (1895–1980), Australian international player, cousin of Aub
 Aub Oxford, international referee, cousin of Arthur

P

Paea brothers 
 Lelea Paea (born 1983), Tonga international and Sydney Roosters NRL player
 Lopini Paea (born 1984), Tonga international and Sydney Roosters NRL player
 Mickey Paea (born 1986), Tonga international and Sydney Roosters NRL player
 Eddie Paea cousin of Lelea, Lopina and Mickey former South Sydney Player

Parcell family 
Percy Parcell, Queensland interstate representative and Ipswich Brothers player
Gary Parcell (born 1933), Australian international and Queensland interstate representative and Ipswich Brothers player; grandfather of Matt
Matt Parcell (born 1992), Brisbane Broncos and Manly Warringah NRL player and Leeds SL player; grandson of Gary

Paul brothers 
 Henry Paul (born 1974), New Zealand international and Wigan/Bradford/Harlequins Super League player
 Robbie Paul (born 1976), New Zealand international and Bradford/Huddersfield/Salford/Leigh Super League player

Paulo brothers 
 Junior Paulo (born 1983), American international, Parramatta player
 Joseph Paulo (born 1988), Samoan and American international, Penrith, Parramatta, Cronulla, St. Helens, and Toulouse player

Peachey family 
 David Peachey, Australian international, New South Wales representative and Crunulla/South Sydney NRL player; uncle of Tyrone Peachey
 Tyrone Peachey, Cronulla and Penrith NRL player; nephew of David Peachey

1st Pearce family 
Sid "Sandy" Pearce (1883–1930), Australian international and Eastern suburbs NSWRFL player; father of Joe
Joe Pearce (1910–1995), Australian international and Eastern suburbs NSWRFL player and coach; son of Sandy

2nd Pearce family 
Wayne Pearce (born 1960), Australian international, New South Wales representative and Balmain Tigers player; father of Mitchell
Mitchell Pearce (born 1989), New South Wales representative and Sydney Roosters player; son of Wayne

Pearce-Paul family 
Kai Pearce-Paul, Wigan Warriors Super League player, brother of Kam
Kam Pearce-Paul, London Skolars player, brother of Kai

Peats family 
Geordi Peats (born 1969), Canterbury & South Sydney; father of Nathan
Nathan Peats (born 1990), South Sydney, Parramatta, Gold Coast Titans, Leigh & Huddersfield; son of Geordi

Pepperell brothers 
Stanley Pepperell (born 1915) England international, Cumberland representative, and Seaton and Huddersfield player
Russell Pepperell (born 1918) England international, Cumberland representative, and Seaton and Huddersfield player
Albert Pepperell (born 1920) Great Britain international, Cumberland representative, and Seaton and Huddersfield player

Perrett brothers 
Lloyd Perrett (born 1994), Canterbury-Bankstown and Manly-Warringah NRL player
Sam Perrett (born 1985), New Zealand international, Sydney Roosters and Canterbury-Bankstown Bulldogs player

Pethybridge family 
Gary Pethybridge, Parramatta, St. George and Parramatta player; father of Scott
Scott Pethybridge, Penrith, North Sydney, Auckland and Northern Eagles player; son of Gary

Phillips brothers 
Brett Phillips, brother of Callum, Scottish international
Callum Phillips, brother of Brett, Scottish international

Pickup family 
Laurie Pickup, Eastern Suburbs NSWRFL player, uncle of Tim
Tim Pickup, Australian international and New South Wales interstate representative player, nephew of Laurie

Pimblett family 
Geoff Pimblett (1944–2018), England international & St Helens; grandfather of Josh
Josh Simm (born 2001), St Helens; grandson of Geoff

Pollard family 
Charles "Charlie" Pollard, Great Britain international, father of Roy Pollard, older brother of Ernest Pollard
Ernest Pollard, Great Britain international, younger brother of Charles Pollard
Roy Pollard, Great Britain international, son of Charles Pollard

Platz brothers 
Greg Platz, Australian international, Queensland representative and Wynnum-Manly BRL player
Lew Platz, Australian international, Queensland representative and BRL player

Prentice brothers 
Ward Prentice (1886–1960), Western Suburbs player
Clarrie Prentice (1891–1948), Australian international and Western Suburbs player

Prescott family 
Eric Prescott (born 1948), St Helens, Salford and Widnes RFL player; father of Steve
Steve Prescott (1973–2013), England and Ireland international and St Helens, Hull F.C. and Wakefield Trinity player; son of Eric

Price/Diversi family 
Kevin Price, North Sydney NSWRL player; father of Ray and brother-in-law of Peter Diversi
Ray Price (born 1953), Dual Australian rugby international, New South Wales representative and Parramatta NSWRL player; son of Kevin and nephew of Peter Diversi
Peter Diversi (born 1932), Australian international, New South Wales representative and North Sydney and Manly-Warringah NSWRL player; uncle of Ray Price

Pritchard brothers 
Frank Pritchard (born 1983), New Zealand and Samoan international, Penrith, Canterbury-Bankstown, Hull F.C., Parramatta player
Kaysa Pritchard (born 1994), Samoan international, Parramatta NRL player

Prosser brothers 
Dai Prosser (1912–1973), GB & Wales international, Leeds & York; younger brother of Glyn
Glyn Prosser (1907–1972), Huddersfield; older brother of Dai

Provan brothers 
Norm Provan (born 1932), Australian international, New South Wales representative and St. George NSWRFL player; brother of Peter
Peter Provan (born 1936), Australian international and St. George and Balmain NSWRFL player; brother of Norm

Pryce family 
Geoff Pryce (born 1961), York Wasps
Karl Pryce (born 1986), Bradford Bulls Super League player; brother of Leon and cousin of Waine
Leon Pryce (born 1981), English international and Bradford Bulls Super League player; brother of Karl and cousin of Waine
Waine Pryce (born 1981), Castleford Tigers, Wakefield Trinity, Featherstone Rovers Super League player; cousin of Leon and Karl
Will Pryce Huddersfield Giants Super League player; son of Leon and nephew of Karl

Puletua brothers 
Frank Puletua (born 1978), Samoa international and Penrith Panthers player
Tony Puletua (born 1979), New Zealand international and Penrith Panthers player

Q

Quinlivan brothers 
Alan Quinlivan (1915–1965), South Sydney & Eastern Suburbs player
Clinton Quinlivan University, South Sydney & Canterbury player
Jack Quinlivan South Sydney player
Leon Quinlivan South Sydney player
Oscar Quinlivan (1897–1949), South Sydney & NSW player

R

Randall family 
Terry Randall (born 1951), Australian international, New South Wales representative Manly-Warringah NSWRFL player; father of Chad
Chad Randall (born 1980), Northern Eagles and Manly-Warringah NRL player; son of Terry

Rapana siblings 
 Jordan Rapana, New Zealand and Cook Islands international, Gold Coast and Canberra NRL player; brother of Tamzin
 Tazmin Gray, Australian women's international, Sydney, Brisbane, and New Zealand Warriors NRLW player

Raper family 
Johnny Raper (born 1939), Australian international and New South Wales representative. Newtown and St George NSWRFL player and St George/Cronulla/Newtown NSWRFL coach, inaugural Rugby League Immortal; brother of Ron, father of Aaron and Stuart
Maurie Raper, Cronulla-Sutherland and Penrith player; brother of John and Ron, uncle of Aaron and Stuart
Ron Raper (born 1945), Canterbury-Bankstown NSWRFL player, Redcliffe BRL player and Western Suburbs BRL captain-coach; brother of John and Maurie, uncle of Aaron and Stuart
Aaron Raper (born 1971), Australian international player, Cronulla-Sutherland/Parramatta NSWRL player, Castleford SL player, Cronulla Jersey Flegg coach; son of Johnny, nephew of Maurie and Ron and brother of Stuart
Stuart Raper (born 1965), Cronulla-Sutherland and Western Suburbs NSWRL player and Cronulla coach; son of Johnny, nephew of Maurie and Ron and brother of Stuart

Rapira brothers 
Sam Rapira, New Zealand international and brother of Steve
Steve Rapira, New Zealand Warriors and North Queensland Cowboys player, brother of Sam

Rayne twins 
Keith Rayne, Great Britain international, twin brother of Kevin
Kevin Rayne, Great Britain international, twin brother of Keith

Reddy family 
Rod Reddy (born 1954), Australian international, New South Wales and Queensland representative, St. George/Illawarra player and Adelaide Rams NRL coach; father of Joel
Joel Reddy (born 1985), Parramatta, Wests Tigers and South Sydney NRL player; son of Rod

Redfearn brothers 
David Redfearn, Great Britain international, brother of Alan
Alan Redfearn, Great Britain international, brother of David

Redmond family 
Dave Redmond, New Zealand international 1948–9
Wayne Redmond, New Zealand international 1970; son of Dave

Ricketson family 
Doug Ricketson (1930–2019), Eastern Suburbs NSWRFL player; father of Luke
Luke Ricketson (born 1973), Australian international and Sydney Roosters NRL player; son of Doug

Risman family 
Gus Risman (1911–1994), Great Britain international; father of Bev and John
Bev Risman (born 1937), Great Britain international; son of Gus
John Risman (born 1944), Wales international; son of Gus

Roberts family 
The Roberts family falls into the broader Dunghutti peoples family tree.
 Amos Roberts (born 1980), St George Illawarra, Penrith, Sydney, Wigan player, cousin of Tyrone, uncle of James and Tyronne
 Tyrone Roberts (born 1991), Newcastle, Gold Coast, Warrington player, cousin of Amos, first cousin once removed of James and Tyronne
 James Roberts (born 1993), South Sydney, Penrith, Gold Coast, Brisbane player, nephew of Amos, first cousin once removed of Tyrone, cousin of Tyronne
 Tyronne Roberts-Davis (born 1997), Gold Coast player, nephew of Amos, first cousin once removed of Tyrone, cousin of James

Robertson brothers 
Bruce Robertson, New Zealand international
Mauri Robertson, New Zealand international

Robinson/Merritt family 
 Eric Robinson (born 1942), South Sydney player; father of Ricky Walford, grandfather of Robinson twins and Nathan Merritt
 Ricky Walford (born 1963), Eastern Suburbs, North Sydney, St George player; son of Eric Robinson, uncle of Robinson twins and Nathan Merritt
 Reece Robinson (born 1987), Lebanon international, Brisbane, Canberra, Parramatta, Sydney, NSW Waratahs (rugby union) player; grandson of Eric Robinson, nephew of Ricky Walford, twin brother of Travis, cousin of Nathan Merritt, step-brother of Beau Champion
 Travis Robinson (born 1987), Lebanon international, Penrith player; grandson of Eric Robinson, nephew of Ricky Walford, twin brother of Reece, cousin of Nathan Merritt, step-brother of Beau Champion
 Nathan Merritt (born 1983), South Sydney, Cronulla player; grandson of Eric Robinson, nephew of Ricky Walford, cousin of Robinson twins
 Beau Champion (born 1986), South Sydney, Melbourne, Gold Coast, Parramatta player; step-brother of Robinson twins

Robinson family 
Jason Robinson (born 1974), Great Britain & England international, Hunslet & Wigan Warriors SL player; father of Lewis Tierney.
Lewis Tierney (born 1994), Wigan Warriors SL player; son of Jason Robinson.

Rogers family 
The Rogers' total of 35 Tests is an Australian record for a father and son combination.
Steve Rogers (1954–2006), Australian international, New South Wales representative and Cronulla/St George NSWRFL player; father of Mat
Mat Rogers (born 1976), Dual rugby international, Queensland representative and Cronulla/Gold Coast NRL player; son of Steve

Ropati brothers 
Joe Ropati, New Zealand International, Manly-Warringah NSWRL and Warrington RFL player
Iva Ropati, New Zealand International, Sheffield, Featherstone and Oldham RFL player and Parramatta and Auckland NRL player
Tea Ropati (born 1964) New Zealand international, Newcastle Knights and Auckland Warriors NSWRL player and St Helens RFL player
Peter Ropati Te Atatu Roosters NZRL and Leigh Centurions RFL player

Rowles family 
Ron Rowles (born 1928), Manly-Warringah NSWRFL player; father of Peter
Peter Rowles (born 1952), Western Suburbs and Newtown NSWRFL player, Australian rugby international; son of Ron

Rowley family 
Allan Rowley, Leigh, Workington Town, St. Helens, and Carlisle player, father of Paul
Paul Rowley, England international, son of Allan

Russell brothers 
Barry Russell, Eastern Suburbs NSWRFL player
Darcy Russell, Eastern Suburbs NSWRFL player

S

Saifiti brothers 
Daniel Saifiti (born 1996), Fiji, NSW & Newcastle Knights, twin brother of Jacob
Jacob Saifiti (born 1996), Fiji & Newcastle Knights, twin brother of Daniel

Sailor family 
Tristan Sailor (born 1998), St George Dragons; son of Wendell
Wendell Sailor (born 1974), Australia, Queensland, St George Dragons, Brisbane Broncos; father of Tristan

Sampson family 
Dave Sampson (born 1944), Wakefield Trinity, Bramley RLFC & Castleford; father of Dean & brother of Malcolm
Dean Sampson (born 1967), GB & England, Castleford, Gold Coast Chargers & Parramatta; son of Dave & nephew of Malcolm
Malcolm Sampson (1940–2012), Wakefield Trinity, Hull FC & Bramley RLFC; uncle of Paul & Dean and brother of Dave
Paul Sampson (born 1977), Wakefield Trinity & London Broncos; nephew of Dave & Malcolm; cousin of Dean
Other relatives include: Olympic sprinter Denise Ramsden & TV presenter & model Kirsty Gallacher

Satherley brothers 
Cliff Satherley, New Zealand international
Jack Satherley, New Zealand international
Jeffrey Satherley, Auckland representative and Ellerslie Eagles player, brother of Warren and Robert
Warren Satherley, Manukau senior club player
Robert Satherley, senior club player

Sattler family 
John Sattler (born 1942), Australian international, New South Wales and Queensland representative and South Sydney player; father of Scott
Scott Sattler (born 1971), Queensland representative player; son of John

Schultz brothers 
Bill Schultz, New Zealand international
Paul Schultz, New Zealand international

Scott cousins 
Len Scott, New Zealand international
Verdun Scott, New Zealand international and New Zealand cricket international

Sculthorpe brothers 
Paul Sculthorpe (born 1977), English international and Warrington Wolves Super League player
Danny Sculthorpe (born 1979), Warrington Wolves Super League player

Segeyaro family 
Ifiso Segeyaro, Papua New Guinea international player; father of James.
James Segeyaro, Papua New Guinea international player; son of Ifiso.

Senior brothers 
Innes Senior (born 2000), Huddersfield & Wakefield Super League player; twin of Louis
Louis Senior (born 2000), Huddersfield Super League player; twin of Innes

Seu Seu brothers 
Jerry Seu Seu (born 1974), New Zealand and Samoa international, New Zealand Warriors NRL player and Wigan SL player; older brother of Anthony
Anthony Seu Seu, New Zealand Warriors NRL player and Halifax SL player

Shead brothers 
Artie Shead, New Zealand Māori and French international
Phillip Shead, New Zealand Māori and French international

Sheens brothers 
Tim Sheens (born 1950), Penrith Panthers NSWRL player, Australian international and New South Wales Origin coach
Bob Sheens, Eastern Suburbs NSWRL player

Shelford family 
Adrian Shelford (1964–2003), NZ international, Wigan, Newcastle Knights, Manly, Wakefield Trinity, Sheffield Eagles; father of Kyle
Kyle Shelford (born 1996), Wigan, Swinton, Rochdale Hornets & Warrington Wolves; son of Adrian

Shibasaki brothers 
Gehamat Shibasaki (born 1998), Brisbane Broncos & Newcastle Knights; brother of Enemarki
Enemarki Shibasaki (born 1999), Japan international; brother of Gehamat

Shorrocks brothers 
Jake Shorrocks (born 1995), Wigan Warriors Super League player, brother of Joe
Joe Shorrocks (born 1999), Wigan Warriors Super League player, brother of Jake

Silcock family 
Nat Silcock, Sr., Great Britain international player
Nat Silcock, Jr. (born 1927), Great Britain international player and NSWRFL coach

Simpkins family 
Robert Simpkins, South Sydney Rabbitohs, Sydney Roosters and Gold Coast Chargers player; father of Ryan
Ryan Simpkins, Penrith Panthers player; son of Robert

Sims siblings 
Born to an Australian father, Peter, and a Fijian mother, Jacqueline, all 5 of the Gerringong-raised Sims siblings have achieved national honours in their respective sports, with 4 having played rugby league professionally.

 Ruan Sims (born 1982), Australian women's international, Australian rugby union and rugby sevens international, Sydney Roosters NRLW plauyer
 Ashton Sims (born 1985), Fijian international, St. George Illawarra, Brisbane, North Queensland, Warrington, Toronto player
 Canecia "CJ" Sims (c. 1988), Fijian women's international, Australian women's Gridiron international
 Tariq Sims (born 1990), Fijian international, North Queensland, Newcastle, St. George Illawarra player, NSW Blues
 Korbin Sims (born 1992), Fijian international, Newcastle, Brisbane player

A cousin of the Sims siblings, Reagan Campbell-Gillard (born 1993), is an Australian and Fijian international who has played Penrith and Parramatta in the NRL.

Sinfield family 
Ian Sinfield, Scotland international; older brother of Kevin
Kevin Sinfield, GB, England & Leeds Rhinos; brother of Ian

Sing family 
Noel Sing, Penrith Panthers player
Wayne Sing, Balmain, Eastern Suburbs, North Queensland and Paris SG player; son of Noel

Sironen family 
Paul Sironen (born 1965), Australian international, New South Wales Origin representative and Balmain Tigers player; father of Curtis & Bayley
Curtis Sironen (born 1993), West Tigers, Manly-Warringah Sea Eagles player; son of Paul
Bayley Sironen (born 1996), South Sydney Rabbitohs player, son of Paul

Smith brothers of Australia 
Darren Smith (born 1968), Australian international, Queensland State of Origin and Canterbury Bulldogs/Brisbane Broncos NRL player
Jason Smith (born 1972), Australian international, Queensland State of Origin and Canterbury Bulldogs/Parramatta/Canberra/North Queensland NRL player

Smith family of New Zealand 
George W. Smith, New Zealand international in rugby union and rugby league, uncle of Dick and Jack Smith
Dick Smith, New Zealand international, nephew of George Smith
Jack Smith, New Zealand international, nephew of George Smith

Smith family 
Brian Smith (born 1954), St George Dragons, Parramatta Eels, Newcastle Knights and Sydney Roosters NRL coach; brother of Tony and father of Rohan
Tony Smith (born 1967), Great Britain national coach; brother of Brian and uncle of Rohan
Rohan Smith, Tonga national team coach; son of Brian and nephew of Tony

Sorensen family 
 Bill Sorensen, Tongan-born New Zealand international, brother of Dave, uncle of Dane and Kurt, grandfather of Scott
 Dave Sorensen, New Zealand international, brother of Bill, uncle of Dane and Kurt, great uncle of Scott
 Dane Sorensen, New Zealand international, Cronulla-Sutherland and Eastern Suburbs NSWRFL player, brother of Kurt, nephew of Dave and Bill
 Kurt Sorensen, New Zealand international, Cronulla-Sutherland and Eastern Suburbs NSWRFL player, brother of Dane, nephew of Dave and Bill
 Scott Sorensen, Australian-born Cronulla-Sutherland Sharks, Canberra Raiders player, grandson of Bill
In addition, New Zealand and Samoa international Leeson Ah Mau married Rose Sorensen Cann (granddaughter of Bill and cousin of Scott), while Chad Townsend married Marissa Sorensen (granddaughter of Bill and sister of Scott).

Southernwood family 
Cain Southernwood, son of Graham; Bradford, Dewsbury, Batley, Whitehaven & Hunslet
Graham Southernwood, father of Cain; Castleford, Featherstone & Hunslet
Roy Southernwood, brother of Graham; Castleford, Halifax & Wakefield

Spencer brothers of New Zealand 
George Spencer, New Zealand international
John Spencer, New Zealand international

Spencer family of Australia 
Jack Spencer, Balmain NSWRFL player; father of John
John Spencer, Balmain NSWRFL player; son of Jack

Spina family 
Ben Spina, North Queensland Cowboys player, son of Laurie
Laurie Spina, North Sydney Bears, Sydney Roosters, Cronulla-Sutherland Sharks and North Queensland Cowboys player; father of Ben

Stanaway brothers 
Alex Stanaway, New Zealand international and Māori representative
Jack Stanaway, international referee and Māori representative

Steinohrt brothers 
Arch Steinohrt, Queensland representative and Toowoomba Valleys player
Herb Steinohrt (1899–1985), Australian international, Queensland representative and Toowoomba Valleys player

Stephenson family 
Francis Stephenson (born 1976), England international, Wakefield Trinity, Wigan, London Broncos & Hull KR; son of Nigel
Nigel Stephenson (born 1950), England international, Dewsbury, Bradford Northern, Carlisle, Wakefield Trinity, York Wasps & Huddersfield; father of Francis
Not related to: Mike Stephenson (Stevo)

Stewart brothers 
Brett Stewart (born 1985), Australian international, New South Wales representative and Manly-Warringah NRL player
Glenn Stewart (born 1984), Australian international, New South Wales representative, Manly-Warringah and South Sydney NRL player, Catalans Dragons and Leigh SL player

Stewart family 
Bruce Stewart, Eastern Suburbs NSWRFL player; father of Corey
Corey Stewart, Eastern Suburbs NSWRL player; son of Bruce

Stirling family 
Ivor Stirling, New Zealand international 1939
Ken Stirling, New Zealand international 1971–8; son of Ivor

Stone family 
Rick Stone (born 1967), South Sydney Rabbitohs; father of Sam
Sam Stone (born 1997), Malta international, Newcastle Knights, Gold Coast Titans & Leigh Centurions; son of Rick

Sullivan family of Australia 
Con Sullivan, New Zealand and Australian international, New South Wales representative and North Sydney NSWRFL player; father of Bob
Bob Sullivan, Australian international and North Sydney NSWRFL player; son of Con

Sullivan family of Wales 
Clive Sullivan (1943–1985), Welsh and Great Britain international and Hull, Hull KR, Oldham and Doncaster player; father of Anthony
Anthony Sullivan (born 1968), Great Britain and Dual Welsh rugby international, Hull KR and St Helens player; son of Clive

Swann family 
Anthony Swann (born 1975), New Zealand and Samoa international, Auckland/North Sydney/Canberra NRL player and Warrington Wolves SL player; brother of Willie and cousin of Logan
Willie Swann (born 1974), Samoa international, Auckland Warriors and Warrington Wolves player; brother of Anthony and cousin of Logan
Logan Swann (born 1975), New Zealand international, Auckland Warriors NRL player and Bradford Bulls and Warrington Wolves player; cousin of Anthony and Willie

T

Tagive brothers 
Peni Tagive (born 1988), Wests, St George Dragons & Sydney Roosters; older brother of Ratu
Ratu Tagive (born 1991), Canterbury Bulldogs, Sydney Roosters & Wests Tigers; younger brother of Peni

Tamati family 
Howie Tamati, New Zealand international player and coach, Wigan RFL player; cousin of Kevin
Kevin Tamati (born 1953), New Zealand and New Zealand Māori international, Widnes and Warrington RFL player; cousin of Howie

Tassell brothers 
Brad Tassell, CEO of PNG Hunters, brother of Jason and Kris
Jason Tassell (born 1969), Eastern Suburbs & South Sydney; brother of Brad & Kris
Kris Tassell (born 1973), Canberra Raiders, Canterbury Bulldogs, N Queensland Cowboys, Salford City Reds, Wakefield Trinity & Swinton Lions; brother of Brad & Jason

Tatupu/Simona/Wright/Sene-Lafeo/Sauiluma/Liolevave family 
Tony Tatupu (born 1969), Western Samoa and New Zealand international, Auckland NRL, Warrington and Wakefield SL player; uncle of Matthew Wright
Tim Simona (born 1991), Samoan international and Wests Tigers NRL player; uncle of Jesse Sene-Lefao and Matthew Wright, cousin of Sami Sauiluma
Matthew Wright (born 1991), Samoan international and Cronulla, North Queensland and Manly-Warringah NRL player; nephew of Tony Tatupu and Tim Simona, cousin of Jesse Sene-Lefao and Lamar Liolevave
Jesse Sene-Lefao (born 1989), Samoan international, Manly-Warringah and Cronulla NRL player and Castleford SL player; nephew of Tim Simona and cousin of Matthew Wright
Sami Sauiluma (born 1991), Canberra, Cronulla and Gold Coast Titans NRL player; cousin of Tim Simona
Lamar Liolevave (born 1995), Wests Tigers and Canterbury-Bankstown NRL player; cousin of Matthew Wright

Tennant family 
Alan Tennant (1930–1997), Featherstone Rovers; son of Buff Lord
Clive Tennant (born 1956), Featherstone Rovers; son of Walter, grandson of Buff Lord (Harold Tennant), and nephew of Alan
Buff Lord (1892–1985), Hull KR; father of Nelson, Walter & Alan
Nelson Tennant (1923–2006), Featherstone Rovers & St Helens; son of Buff Lord, and younger brother of Walter Tennant, and the older brother of Alan Tennant, uncle of Clive Tennant
Walter Tennant (1921-unknown), Featherstone Rovers & Wakefield Trinity, father of Clive, son of Harold (Buff Lord)

Thaiday family 
Sam Thaiday (born 1985), Australian international, Queensland Origin representative and Brisbane Broncos NRL player; cousin of Milton
Milton Thaiday (born 1980), Newcastle Knights player

Thomson family 
Jim Thomson, Balmain player; brother of Allan and father of Gary and Ian
Allan Thomson (1943–2006), Australian international and Manly-Warringah NSWRFL player; brother of Jim and uncle of Gary and Ian
Gary Thomson, Balmain player; son of Jim, nephew of Allan and brother of Ian
Ian Thomson (born 1956), Australian international and New South Wales representative, Manly-Warringah and Balmain player, and Manly-Warringah CEO; son of Jim, nephew of Allan and brother of Gary

Thornett brothers 
Ken Thornett (born 1937), Australian international, New South Wales representative and Parramatta NSWRFL player and coach and Leeds RFL player
Dick Thornett (born 1940), Dual Australian rugby international, New South Wales representative and Parramatta and Eastern Suburbs NSWRFL player

Tittleton brothers 
George Tittleton, New Zealand international
Wally Tittleton, New Zealand international

Tomkins brothers 
Joel Tomkins, England international representative and Super League Wigan Warriors player
Sam Tomkins, England international representative and Super League Wigan Warriors player, New Zealand Warriors player.
Logan Tomkins, Super League Wigan Warriors & Salford Red Devils player

Tonga brothers 
Willie Tonga (born 1983), Australian international and NRL player
Esi Tonga (born 1988), Tonga international and NRL player

Trbojevic brothers 
Ben Trbojevic (born 2001), Manly Sea Eagles; youngest brother of Jake & Tom
Jake Trbojevic (born 1994), Australian international, Manly-Warringah NRL player
Tom Trbojevic (born 1996), Manly-Warringah NRL player

Trevathan/Trevathen family 
William Trevarthen, 1907–08 New Zealand international
David Trevathan, brother of Thomas, All Black
Thomas Trevarthan, brother of David, New Zealand international

Trindall brothers 
Craig Trindall (born 1979), Penrith Panthers NRL player, brother of Darrell and Steve
Darrell Trindall (born 1972), South Sydney Rabbitohs NSWRL player, brother of Craig and Steve
Steve Trindall (born 1973), Canberra Raiders NSWRL player, brother of Craig and Darrell

Tronc family 
James Tronc, Redcliffe Dolphins and Souths Magpies player; father of Shane
Scott Tronc (born 1965) Western Suburbs, Canterbury, South Sydney, Brisbane Broncos; brother of James
Shane Tronc (born 1982) N Queensland Cowboys, Wakefield Trinity & Brisbane Broncos; son of James

Tuimavave/Winterstein family 
Tony Tuimavave (born 1969), Samoan international, Sheffield Eagles Super League and Auckland Warriors NRL player, brother of Paddy and Paki and uncle of Antonio
Paddy Tuimavave, New Zealand and Samoa international player; uncle of Evarn, brother of Tony and Paki and uncle of Antonio
Paki Tuimavave, Western Samoa international; brother of Tony and Paddy
Evarn Tuimavave (born 1984), New Zealand international and Newcastle Knights player; nephew of Tony and Paddy
Carlos Tuimavave, New Zealand Warriors player; nephew of Tony and Paddy and cousin of Antonio
Antonio Winterstein (born 1988), North Queensland Cowboys player; nephew of Tony and Paddy and cousin of Evarn and Carlos Tuimavave and Frank Winterstein
Frank Winterstein (born 1986), Samoan international, Canterbury-Bankstown and Manly-Warringah NRL player, Wakefield Trinity, Crusaders and Widnes SL player; cousin of Antonio

Tupou brothers 
 Anthony Tupou, (born 1984), Australian international; Sydney Roosters and Cronulla-Sutherland Sharks player
 Ben Tupou, former Newcastle Knights player
 Willie Tupou, (born 1985), former Newcastle Knights player

Tuqiri family 
Elia Tuqiri (born 1982), Brisbane Broncos; cousin of Lote
Lote Tuqiri (born 1979), Fiji & Australia dual-code & Brisbane Broncos, Wests Tigers & South Sydney; cousin of Elia

Tyrer family 
Colin Tyrer, Lancashire, Leigh, Wigan, Barrow and Hull Kingston Rovers player, father of Shaun and Christian
Shaun Tyrer, Wigan, Oldham, and Whitehaven player, son of Colin, and brother of Christian
Christian Tyrer (born 1973), Widnes, Keighley Cougars, and Bath (RU) player, son of Colin, and brother of Shaun

Tyquin brothers 
Bill Tyquin (1919–1999), Australian international, Queensland and New South Wales representative, Souths Magpies and Brisbane Brothers BRL player and St George NSWRFL player
Tom Tyquin (born 1932), Queensland representative and Souths Magpies BRL player

V

Vagana cousins 
Nigel Vagana (born 1975), New Zealand and Samoa international, and Auckland Warriors, Bulldogs, Sharks, Rabbitohs NRL player
Joe Vagana (born 1975), New Zealand and Samoa international, and Auckland Warriors NRL player

Valentine brothers of Scotland 
Alec Valentine (1928–1997), Scotland rugby union international, younger brother of Dave and elder brother of Rob
Dave Valentine (1926–1976), Great Britain international & Huddersfield, elder brother of Alec and Rob
Rob Valentine (born 1941), Great Britain international, Huddersfield, Wakefield Trinity & Keighley – younger brother of Alec and Dave

Valentine brothers of England 
Jim Valentine – 1880s, '90s, 1900s Rugby Union & Northern Union (from 1896). England, Lancashire & club level for Swinton.
Bob Valentine – 1890s & 1900s Northern Union. Lancashire & club level for Swinton. Also as goalkeeper for Manchester United F.C.
 Albert Valentine – 1900s & 1910s Northern Union. Club level for Swinton.

Van Bellen brothers 
Gary Van Bellen (born 1957), Bradford Northern, Hunslet RLFC, Leigh, Wakefield Trinity & Sheffield Eagles; younger brother of Ian
Ian Van Bellen (1945–2019), Huddersfield, Bradford Northern, Castleford, Fulham RLFC, Blackpool Borough, Halifax, Kent Invicta & Keighley; older brother of Gary

Veivers family 
Jack Veivers, Queensland representative and Souths Magpies player; father of Greg and Phil, and uncle of Mick
Greg Veivers, Australian international, Queensland representative and Souths Magpies player; son of Jack, brother of Phil and cousin of Mick
Phil Veivers, Souths Magpies, St. Helens and Huddersfield player, Assistant coach at Bradford and Wigan, Coach at Salford City Reds Super League; son of Jack, brother of Greg and cousin of Mick, Father of Josh
Mick Veivers, Australian international, Queensland representative, Souths Magpies BRL (Brisbane) and Manly-Warringah (NSWRFL) player; nephew of Jack and cousin of Greg and Phil
Josh Veivers, Wigan, Wakefield and Salford player, son of Phil, nephew of Greg, Grandson of Jack and Cousin of Mick

W

Walker family 
Ben Walker (born 1976), Brisbane Broncos, Northern Eagles, Manly-Warringah and South Sydney Rabbitohs NRL player; brother of Shane and Chris, father of Sam
Shane Walker (born 1978), Brisbane Broncos and South Sydney Rabbitohs NRL player
Chris Walker (born 1980), Queensland State of Origin representative, Brisbane/South Sydney/Sydney Roosters/Melbourne/Gold Coast/North Queensland NRL player
Sam Walker (born 2002), Sydney Roosters player

Walker brothers of Britain 
Adam Walker, brother of Jonathan, Scottish international
Jonathan Walker, brother of Adam, Scottish international

Walne brothers 
Adam Walne, brother of Jordan, Huddersfield & Salford
Jordan Walne, brother of Adam, Hull KR & Salford

Walters brothers 
Steve Walters (born 1965), Australian international, Queensland State of Origin and Canberra/North Queensland/Newcastle NRL player
Kevin Walters (born 1967), Australian international, Queensland State of Origin, Canberra Raiders and Brisbane Broncos NRL player; twin of Kerrod
Kerrod Walters (born 1967), Australian international, Queensland State of Origin and Brisbane Broncos and Adelaide Rams NRL player; twin of Kevin

Ward brothers 
Donald Ward (1914-unknown), Dewsbury, Bradford Northern & Celtic de Paris; brother of Ernest
Ernest Ward (1920–1987), GB & England international, Bradford Northern & Castleford; brother of Donald

Warren family 
Ray Warren (born 1943), rugby league commentator and father of Chris
Chris Warren (born 1970) Western Suburbs NSWRL player, television presenter and son of Ray

Watene family 
Adam Watene (1977–2008), Cook Island international and Super League player; cousin of Frank
Frank Watene (born 1977), Tonga international and Super League player; cousin of Adam

Watene-Zelezniak family 
 Puti Tipene Watene (1910–1967; "Steve"), New Zealand international, later a Member of Parliament; great-grandfather of Malakai and Dallin
 Malakai Watene-Zelezniak (born 1991), Penrith, Wests Tigers player; brother of Dallin
 Dallin Watene-Zelezniak (born 1995), Penrith, Bulldogs player; brother of Malakai

Watt family 
Horrie Watt, Australian international player; uncle of George
George Watt, Australian international player; nephew of Horrie

West family 
Graeme West (born 1953), New Zealand international and Wigan RFL player. Wigan and Widnes RFL coach; father of Dwayne
Dwayne West (born 1980), Wigan, St Helens and Hull F.C. SL player, son of Graeme

White brothers of Australia 
Percy White (1888–1918), Eastern Suburbs NSWRFL player
Eddie White (1883–1962), Eastern Suburbs NSWRFL player

White brothers of New Zealand 
Jim White, New Zealand international
Pat White, New Zealand international

Why brothers 
Jack Why, Australian international and South Sydney player
Alby Why, South Sydney player and Canterbury-Bankstown coach

Willey/Don family 
Ron Willey (1929–2004), New South Wales representative player and coach, Manly-Warringah player and premiership coach, Canterbury-Bankstown and Parramatta player. Balmain, North Sydney, South Sydney, Penrith and Bradford Northern coach; grandfather of Anthony Don
Anthony Don (born 1987), Gold Coast Titans NRL player; grandson of Ron Willey

Williams brothers 
John Williams (born 1985), Parramatta, Sydney Roosters, North Queensland and Cronulla NRL player
David Williams (born 1986), Australian international, New South Wales Origin representative and Manly-Warringah NRL player

Williamson family 
Lionel Williamson (born 1944), Australian international and Queensland and New South Wales representative player, Halifax RFL and Newtown NSWRFL player; brother of Henry and uncle of Luke
Henry Williamson, Queensland representative player; father of Luke and brother of Lionel
Luke Williamson (born 1978), Adelaide/Canberra/Northern Eagles/Manly-Warringah NRL player, Harlequins SL player; son of Henry and nephew of Lionel
Lindsay Collins (born 1996), Queensland representative and Sydney Roosters NRL player; grandson of Lionel

Wilson family 
Graham Wilson, Australian international, New South Wales representative and Cronulla-Sutherland NSWRL player; father of Alan
Alan Wilson, New South Wales representative and Cronulla-Sutherland NSWRL player; son of Graham

Witt brothers 
Michael Witt (born 1984), Parramatta, Manly-Warringah, NZ Warriors, Celtic Crusaders, London Broncos and St George Illawarra player
Steve Witt (born 1982), Newcastle Knights player

Wittenberg family 
John Wittenberg (1938–2005), Australian international, Queensland and New South Wales representative. St George NSWRFL player; father of Jeff
Jeff Wittenberg (born 1973), St George/South Queensland NSWRL player, Bradford/Huddersfield SL player; son of John

Wood family 
Barry Wood (born 1950), Newtown, South Sydney & North Sydney Bears; father of Garth & Nathan
Garth Wood (born 1978), South Sydney, Balmain & Super Middleweight boxer; son of Barry & brother of Nathan
Nathan Wood (born 1972), Balmain Tigers, Sydney Roosters, NZ Warriors, Wakefield Trinity & Warrington Wolves; son of Barry & brother of Garth

Worrincy brothers 
Michael Worrincy (born 1986), London Super League player
Rob Worrincy (born 1985), London Super League player

Wright brothers 
Nick Wright, New Zealand international
Owen Wright, New Zealand international

Wynyard brothers 
William Wynyard, New Zealand international player
Richard Wynyard, New Zealand international player

Wynn brothers 
Peter Wynn (born 1957), Australian international, New South Wales representative, and Parramatta Eels NSWRL player
Graeme Wynn (born 1959), New South Wales representative, St. George and Western Suburbs NSWRL player

Y

Yakich brothers 
 Fred Yakich, Manly-Warringah NSWRFL player
 Nick Yakich, New South Wales representative and Manly-Warringah NSWRFL player

Yates family 
 John Yates, New Zealand international; brother of Victor
 Victor Yates, Auckland representative and New Zealand rugby union international; brother of John

Yeo family 
 Isaah Yeo, Penrith Panthers players; son of Justin
 Justin Yeo, North Sydney Bears and Balmain Tigers player; father of Isaah

Young family 
 Craig Young (born 1956), Australian international, New South Wales representative, and St George NSWRL player and coach; father of Dean
 Dean Young (born 1983), St. George Illawarra NRL player and son of Craig

Yow Yeh family 
Kevin is the first cousin of Jharal's grandfather, making them first cousins, twice removed.
 Kevin Yow Yeh (1941–1975), Redcliffe BRL and Balmain NSWRFL player
 Jharal Yow Yeh (born 1989), Australian international and Queensland Origin representative, Brisbane Broncos NRL player

References

External links 
 Coffey and Wood The Kiwis: 100 Years of International Rugby League 

Families
Rugby league families
Rugby league